This is an incomplete list of Acts of the Parliament of the United Kingdom for the years 1860–1879.  Note that the first parliament of the United Kingdom was held in 1801; parliaments between 1707 and 1800 were either parliaments of Great Britain or of Ireland).  For Acts passed up until 1707 see List of Acts of the Parliament of England and List of Acts of the Parliament of Scotland.  For Acts passed from 1707 to 1800 see List of Acts of the Parliament of Great Britain.  See also the List of Acts of the Parliament of Ireland.

For Acts of the devolved parliaments and assemblies in the United Kingdom, see the List of Acts of the Scottish Parliament, the List of Acts of the Northern Ireland Assembly, and the List of Acts and Measures of the National Assembly for Wales; see also the List of Acts of the Parliament of Northern Ireland.

The number shown after each Act's title is its chapter number. Acts passed before 1963 are cited using this number, preceded by the year(s) of the reign during which the relevant parliamentary session was held; thus the Union with Ireland Act 1800 is cited as "39 & 40 Geo. 3 c. 67", meaning the 67th Act passed during the session that started in the 39th year of the reign of George III and which finished in the 40th year of that reign.  Note that the modern convention is to use Arabic numerals in citations (thus "41 Geo. 3" rather than "41 Geo. III"). Acts of the last session of the Parliament of Great Britain and the first session of the Parliament of the United Kingdom are both cited as "41 Geo. 3".

Some of these Acts have a short title. Some of these Acts have never had a short title.  Some of these Acts have a short title given to them by later Acts, such as by the Short Titles Act 1896.

1860 – 1869

1860 (23 & 24 Vict.)

Public General Acts
 Admiralty Jurisdiction (India) Act 1860 c 88
 Admiralty Offences (Colonial) Act 1860 c 122
 Adulteration of Food and Drink Act 1860 c 84
 Annual Inclosure Act 1860 c 17. Sometimes called the Inclosure Act.
 Annual Revision of Rateable Property (Ireland) Amendment Act 1860 c 4
 Annual Turnpike Acts Continuance Act 1860 c 73
Annuity Tax Abolition Act 1860 c 50. Also called the Annuity-tax (Edinburgh and Montrose) Abolition Act 1860, the Annuity-Tax (Edinburgh and Montrose) Act 1860, the Annuity Tax Abolition (Edinburgh and Montrose &c.) Act, and the Annuity Tax in Edinburgh and Montrose Act 1860.
 Anstruther Union Harbour Act 1860 c 39
 Appropriation Act 1860 c 131
 Bank of Ireland Act 1860 c 31
 Bankruptcy (Scotland) Amendment Act 1860 c 33
 Bleaching and Dyeing Works Act 1860 c 78
 Borough Coroners (Ireland) Act 1860 c 74
 Burgesses (Scotland) Act 1860 c 47
 Burial Act 1860 c 64
 Burial Grounds (Ireland) Act 1860 c 76
 Caledonian and Crinan Canals Amendment Act 1860 c 46
 Castle Stewart and Nairn Road Assessment Act 1860 c 37
 Census (Scotland) Act 1860 c 98
 Census Act 1860 c 61
 Census Act 1860 c 62
 Chancery Rules and Orders Act 1860 Also called the Chancery Evidence Act 1860 and the Chancery Evidence Commission Act. c 128
 Charitable Trusts Act 1860 c 136
 Church Temporalities Act 1860 c 150.
 Colewort Barracks, Portsmouth Act 1860 c 49
 Common Law Procedure Act 1860 c 126
 Common Law Procedure (Ireland) Act 1860 c 82
 Common Lodging Houses Act, Ireland, 1860 c 26. Commonly called the Common Lodging Houses (Ireland) Act 1860 and sometimes the Common Lodging Houses Act 1860.
 Confirmation of Marriages Act 1860 c 1
 Consolidated Fund (£407,649) Act c 2
 Consolidated Fund (£4,500,000) Act c 3
 Consolidated Fund (£10,000,000) Act c 103
 Copyhold Commission Continuance Act 1860 c 81
 Corrupt Practices 1854, Act Continuance Act 1860 c 99
 County Coroners Act 1860 c 116
 Court of Chancery Act 1860 c 149
 Court of Queen's Bench Act Amendment Act c 54. Sometimes referred to as the Crown Office Act 1860.
 Criminal Lunatic Asylums Act 1860 c 75
 Crown Debts and Judgments Act 1860 c 115
 Customs Duties Consolidation Act 1860 c 110. Sometimes called the Customs Consolidation Act 1860.
 Customs Inland Bonding Act 1860 c 36
 Customs Tariff Amendment Act 1860 c 22
 Debtors and Creditors Act 1860 c 147
 Defence Act 1860 c 112
 Dominica Loan Act 1860 or the Dominica Hurricane Loan Act c 57
 Duchy of Cornwall Act 1860 c 53
 East India Loan Act 1860 c 130
 East India Stock Act 1860 c 102
 Ecclesiastical Commissioners Act 1860 c 124
 Ecclesiastical Courts Jurisdiction Act 1860 c 32
 Endowed Schools Act 1860 c 11
 Endowment and Augmentation of small Benefices Act (Ireland) 1860 c 72. Sometimes called the Endowment and Augmentation of Small Benefices (Ireland) Act 1860.
 Entail Cottages Act 1860 c 95
 European Forces (India) Act 1860 c 100
 Exchequer Bills Act 1860 c 20
 Exchequer Bonds and Bills Act 1860 c 132
 Excise Act 1860 c 113
 Excise on Spirits Act 1860 c 129
 Friendly Societies Act 1860 c 13
 Friendly Societies Act 1860 c 58
 Game Licences Act 1860 c 90
 Gunpowder Act 1860 c 139. Sometimes called the Gunpowder and Fireworks Act 1860.
 Heritable Securities (Scotland) Act 1860 c 80
 Herring Fisheries (Scotland) Act 1860 c 92
 Highway Rates Act 1860 c 67
 Income Tax Act 1860 c 14
 Indemnity Act 1860 c 40
 Indian Securities Act 1860 c 5
 Industrial Museum (Scotland) Act 1860 c 117
 Industrial Schools Act 1860 c 108
 Infant Marriage Act 1860 c 83
 Isle of Man Harbours Act 1860 c 56
 Jews Act 1860 c 63
 Labourers (Ireland) Act 1860 c 19
 Landed Property (Ireland) Improvement Act 1860 c 153
 Landlord and Tenant Law Amendment (Ireland) Act 1860 c 154
 Lands Clauses Consolidation Acts Amendment Act 1860 c 106
 Law of Property Amendment Act 1860 c 38
 Leith Harbour and Docks Act 1860 c 48
 Licensing (Ireland) Act 1860 c 35
 Local Government Supplemental Act 1860 c 44
 Local Government Supplemental Act 1860 (No. 2) c 118. Sometimes called the Local Government Supplemental (No. 2) Act 1860.
 Local Taxation Returns Act 1860 c 51
 Malicious Injuries to Property Act 1860 c 29
 Manchester Cathedral Act 1860 c 69
 Marine Mutiny Act 1860 c 10
 Marriage Confirmation Act 1860 c 24
 Marriage (Society of Friends) Act 1860 c 18
 Marriages, Ionian Islands Act 1860 c 86
 Matrimonial Causes Act 1860 c 144
 Maynooth College Act 1860 c 104
 Medical Act 1860 c 66
 Medical Acts Amendment Act 1860 c 7
 Metropolis Gas Act 1860 c 125
 Metropolitan Building Act (Amendment) 1860 c 52
 Metropolitan Police Act 1860 c 135
 Militia (Ballot) Act 1860 c 120
 Militia (Storehouses) Act 1860 c 94
 Militia Pay Act 1860 c 133
 Mines Act 1860 c 151
 Municipal Corporation Mortgages, &c. Act 1860 or the Municipal Corporation (Mortgages, &c.) Act 1860 c 16
 Mutiny Act 1860 c 9
 National Debt Commissioners (Investments) Act 1860 c 137
 Naval Discipline Act 1860 c 123
 Nuisances Removal Act 1860 c 77
 An Act to provide for the Consideration of an Ordinance which has been laid before Parliament in a Report of the Oxford University Commissioners c 23
 Oxford University Act 1860 c 91
 Packet Service, Securities Act 1860 c 6
 Party Emblems (Ireland) Act 1860 c 141
 Pawnbrokers Act 1860 c 21
 Peace Preservation (Ireland) Act 1860 c 138
 Petitions of Right Act 1860 c 34
 Phoenix Park Act 1860 c 42.
 Poison Act 1860 c 8. Sometimes called the Administering of Poison Act. 
 Police of Towns (Scotland) Amendment Act 1860 c 96
 Poor Law Board Continuance Act 1860 c 101
 Poor Law Commissioners (Ireland) Continuance Act 1860 c 148
 Post Office (Duties) Act 1860 c 65
 Powers of Trustees, Mortgagees, etc. Act 1860 c 145
 Prisons (Scotland) Act 1860 or the Prisons (Scotland) Administration Act 1860 c 105
 Probate Duty Act 1860 c 15
 Protection of Royal Arsenals, etc. Act 1860 c 109
 Provisional Order Confirmation Turnpikes Act 1860 c 70
 Public Improvements Act 1860 c 30
 Queen's Prison Act 1860 c 60
 Railways Act (Ireland) 1860 c 97. Sometimes called the Railways (Ireland) Act 1860.
 Railways and Canals Act 1860 c 41
 Reduction of the National Debt Act 1860 c 71
 Refreshment Houses Act 1860 c 27
 Refreshment Houses (Ireland) Act 1860 c 107
 Registration of Births, Deaths, and Marriages (Scotland) Act 1860 c 85
 Repeal of Sir John Barnard's Act 1860 c 28
 Rifle Volunteer Grounds Act 1860 c 140
 Roman Catholic Charities Act 1860 or the Roman Catholic Charities Act c 134
 Sale of Gas Act 1860 c 146
 Second Annual Inclosure Act 1860 c 55. Sometimes called the Inclosure (No. 2) Act.
 Senior Member of Council, India Act 1860 c 87
 Sheriff Court Houses Act 1860 c 79
 Solicitors Act 1860 c 127
 South Wales Highways Act 1860 c 68
 Spirits Act 1860 c 114
 Stamp Duties Act 1860 c 111
 Superannuation Act 1860 c 89
 Supply Act 1860 c 12
 Supply Act 1860 c 25
 Tenison's Charity Act 1860 c 43
 Tithe Act 1860 c 93
 Titles to Land (Scotland) Act 1860 c 143
 Tramways (Ireland) Act 1860 c 152
 Trout (Scotland) Act 1860 c 45
 Union of Benefices Act 1860 c 142
 Universities and College Estates Act Extension 1860 c 59
 Weights and Measures (Ireland) Act 1860 c 119
 West Coast of Africa and Falkland Islands Act 1860 c 121

Local Acts
 Royal Naval School Act 1860 c. civ

1861 (24 & 25 Vict.)

 Accessories and Abettors Act 1861 c 94
 Admiralty Court Act 1861 c 10
 Advances for Public Works Act 1861 c 80
 Affirmations Act 1861 c 66
 Annoyance Jurors, Westminster Act 1861 c 78
 Annual Inclosure Act 1861 c 1
 Annual Turnpike Acts Continuance Act 1861 c 64
 Annuity to Princess Alice Act 1861 c 15
 Appropriation Act 1861 c 103
 Assessments in Edinburgh Act 1861 c 27
 Australian Colonies Act 1861 c 44
 Australian Passengers Act 1861 c 52
 Bank of England Act 1861 c 3
 Bankruptcy Act 1861 c 134
 Birkenhead Enfranchisement Act 1861 c 112
 Boundaries of Burghs Extension (Scotland) Act 1861 c 36
 Burford Charities Act 1861 c 22
 Charitable Uses Act 1861 c 9
 Chatham Dockyard Act 1861 c 41
 Coinage Offences Act 1861 c 99
 Confirmation of Marriages Act 1861 c 16
 Conjugal Rights (Scotland) Amendment Act 1861 c 86
 Consolidated Fund (4,000,000) Act c 2
 Consolidated Fund (3,000,000) Act c 6
 Consolidated Fund (10,000,000) Act c 19
 Copyright of Designs Act 1861 c 73
 Cork Infirmary Act 1861 c 29
 Corrupt Practices Act 1861 c 122
 County Cess. (Ireland) Act 1861 c 58
 County Contributions to Prisons, etc. Act 1861 c 12
 County Surveyors, &c. (Ireland) Act 1861 c 63
 County Voters Registration (Scotland) Act 1861 c 83
 Court of Probate (Ireland) Act 1861 c 111
 Criminal Statutes Repeal Act 1861 c 95
 Crown Suits Act 1861 c 62
 Customs and Inland Revenue Act 1861 c 20
 Dean Forest Act 1861 c 40
 Domicile Act 1861 c 121
 Dublin Improvement Act Amendment Act 1861 c. 26. Sometimes referred to as the Dublin Improvement Act 1861.
 Dublin Revising Barristers Act 1861 c 56
 Durham University Act 1861 c 82
 East India Loan Act 1861 c 25
 East India Loan (No. 2) Act c 118
 Ecclesiastical Leases Act 1861 c 105
 Edinburgh University Property Arrangement Act 1861 c 90
 Enlistment of Persons Transferred from the Indian Forces Act 1861 c 74
 Episcopal and Capitular Estates Act 1861 c 131. Sometimes called the Archdeaconry of Rochester Act 1861.
 Exchequer Bills Act 1861 c 5
 Foreign Law Ascertainment Act 1861 c 11
 Forgery Act 1861 c 98
 General Pier and Harbour Act 1861 c 45
 Guildford Hospital Act 1861 c 32
 Gunpowder and Fireworks Act 1861 c 130
 Harbours and Passing Tolls, &c. Act 1861 c 47
 Holyhead Road Relief Act 1861 c 28. Sometimes called the Holyhead Road Act 1861.
 Improvement of Land (Ireland) Act 1861 c 34
 Indemnity Act 1861 c 77
 Indian Civil Service Act 1861 c 54
 Indian Councils Act 1861 c 67
 Indian High Courts Act 1861 c 104
 Industrial Schools Act 1861 c 113
 Industrial Schools (Scotland) Act 1861 c 132
 Lace Factory Act 1861 c 117. Also called the Lace Factories Act 1861.
 Land Drainage Act 1861 c 133
 Landed Estates Court (Ireland) Act 1861 c 123
 Landlord and Tenant (Ireland) Act 1861 c 48
 Larceny Act 1861 c 96
 Local Government Act (1858) Amendment Act 1861 c 61
 Local Government Supplemental Act 1861 c 39
 Local Government Supplemental Act 1861 (No. 2) c 128
 Locomotive Act 1861 c 70
 London Coal and Wine Duties Continuance Act 1861 c 42
 Lord Clerk Register (Scotland) Act 1861 c 81
 Malicious Damage Act 1861 c 97
 Marine Mutiny Act 1861 c 8
 Metropolis Gas Act 1861 c 79
 Metropolitan Building Amendment Act 1861 c 87
 Metropolitan Police (Receiver) Act 1861 c 124
 Metropolitan Police Act 1861 c 51
 Military and Naval Knights of Windsor Act 1861 c 116
 Militia Ballots Suspension Act 1861 c 120
 Militia Pay Act 1861 c 119
 Municipal Corporations Act Amendment Act 1861 c 75
 Mutiny Act 1861 c 7
 National Debt Act 1861 c 35
 Naval Discipline Act 1861 c 115
 Naval Medical Supplemental Fund Society Winding-up Act 1861 c 108
 New Zealand Provinces Act 1861 c 30
 Offences against the Person Act 1861 c 100
 Officers of Reserve to the Navy Act 1861 c 129
 Old Metal Dealers Act 1861 c 110
 Ordnance Survey Continuance Act 1861 c 65
 Parochial and Burgh Schoolmasters (Scotland) Act 1861 c 107
 Parochial Offices Act 1861 c 125
 Pensions, British Forces (India) Act 1861 c 89
 Petty Sessions, Ireland, Amendment Act 1861 c 49
 Plymouth Marine Barracks Act 1861 c 13
 Poor Law (Scotland) (No. 1) Act 1861 c 18
 Poor Law (Scotland) (No. 2) Act 1861 c 37
 Poor Removal Act 1861 c 55
 Poor Removal (No. 2) Act 1861 c 76
 Portpatrick Harbour Act 1861 c 106
 Post Office Savings Bank Act 1861 or the Post Office Savings Banks Act 1861 c 14
 Private Lunatic Asylums (Ireland) Act 1861 c 57
 Probate Duty Act 1861 c 92
 Public Offices, St. James' Park Act 1861 c 88
 Public Works (Ireland) Act 1861 c 71. Sometimes referred to as the Public Works (Ireland) (Advances and Repayments of Moneys) Act.
 An Act to authorize for a further Period the Application of Money for the Purposes of Loans for carrying on Public Works in Ireland c 85
 Railway Companies Mortgage Transfer (Scotland) Act 1861 c 50
 Reading Charities Act 1861 c 23
 Red Sea and India Telegraph Company Act 1861 c 4
 Representation of the People (Ireland) Act 1861 c 60
 Revenue (No. 1) Act 1861 c 21
 Revenue (No. 2) Act 1861 c 91
 Revenue Departments Accounts Act 1861 c 93
 Salmon Fishery Act 1861 c 109
 Second Annual Inclosure Act 1861 c 38
 Sierra Leone Offences Act 1861 c 31
 Smoke of Furnaces (Scotland) Act 1861 c 17
 Solicitors (Ireland) Act 1861 c 68
 Statute Law Revision Act 1861 c 101
 Summary Procedure on Bills of Exchange (Ireland) Act 1861 c 43
 Supplemental Public Offices Extension Act 1861 c 33
 Temple Balsall Hospital Act 1861 c 24
 Tramways (Ireland) Amendment Act 1861 c 102
 Tramways (Scotland) Act 1861 c 69
 Treasury Chest Fund Act 1861 c 127
 Trusts (Scotland) Act 1861 c 84
 Turnpike Trusts Relief Act 1861 c 46
 University Elections Act 1861 c 53
 Vaccination Acts Amendment Act 1861 c 59
 Volunteers Act 1861 c 126
 White Herring Fishery (Scotland) Act 1861 c 72
 Wills Act 1861 c 114

1862 (25 & 26 Vict.)

 Advances for Public Works Act 1862 c 30
 African Slave Trade Treaty Act (No. 1) 1862 c 40
 African Slave Trade Treaty Act (No. 2) 1862 c 90
 Annual Inclosure Act 1862 c 47
 Annual Turnpike Acts Continuance Act 1862 c 72
 Appropriation Act 1862 c 71
 Artillery Ranges Act 1862 c 36
 Australian Constitutions Act 1862 c 11
 Bank of Ireland, Transfer of Stocks Act 1862 c 21
 Bankruptcy Amendment Act 1862 c 99
 Bleaching Works Act 1862 c 8
 British Forces in India Act 1862 c 27
 Burial Act 1862 c 100
 Chancery Regulation Act 1862 c 42
 Chancery Regulation (Ireland) Act 1862 c 46
 Charitable Trusts Act 1862 c 112
 Charitable Uses Act 1862 c 17
 Coal Mines Act 1862 c 79
 College of Physicians (Ireland) Act 1862 c 15
 Companies Act 1862 c 89
 Confirmation of Sales, etc., by Trustees Act 1862 c 108
 Consolidated Fund (£973,747) Act c 1
 Consolidated Fund (£10,000,000) Act c 31
 Copyhold, etc., Commission Continuance Act 1862 c 73
 Corrupt Practices Act, 1854 Continuance Act 1862 c 109
 County Elections (Ireland) Act 1862 c 62
 County Surveyors (Ireland) Act 1862 c 106
 Court of Common Pleas Act 1862 c 96
 Crown Private Estates Act 1862 c 37
 Crown Suits (Isle of Man) Act 1862 c 14
 Declaration of Title Act 1862 c 67
 Discharged Prisoners' Aid Act 1862 c 44
 Discontinuance of Portsdown Fair, Southampton Act 1862 c 34
 Dogs (Ireland) Act 1862 c 59
 Duchy of Cornwall Lands Act 1862 c 49
 Ecclesiastical Leases Act 1862 c 52
 Elections (Ireland) Act 1862 c 92
 Exchequer Bills Act 1862 c 3
 Exchequer Bonds Act 1862 c 13
 Excise Duties Act 1862 c 84
 Extradition Act 1862 c 70
 Fine Arts Copyright Act 1862 c 68
 General Pier and Harbour Act 1861 Amendment Act or the General Pier and Harbour Act 1861 Amendment Act 1862 c 19
 General Police and Improvement (Scotland) Act 1862 c 101
 Gunpowder Act Amendment Act 1862 c 98
 Habeas Corpus Act 1862 c 20
 Harbours Transfer Act 1862 c 69
 Highland Roads and Bridges Act 1862 c 105
 Highway Act 1862 c 61
 Indemnity Act 1862 c 60
 India Stock Transfer Act 1862 c 7
 Industrial and Provident Societies Act 1862 c 87
 Industrial Schools, 1861 Acts Continuance Act 1862 c 10
 Jamaica Loan Act 1862 c 55
 Juries Act 1862 c 107
 Jurisdiction in Homicides Act 1862 c 65
 Land Registry Act 1862 c 53
 Landed Property Improvement (Ireland) Act 1862 c 29
 Local Government Supplemental Act 1862 c 25
 Lunacy (Scotland) Act 1862 c 54
 Lunacy Acts Amendment Act 1862 c 111
 Lunacy Regulation Act 1862 c 86
 Marine Mutiny Act 1862 c 6
 Medical Council Act 1862 c 91
 Merchandise Marks Act 1862 c 88
 Merchant Shipping Act Amendment Act 1862 c 63
 Metropolis Management Amendment Act 1862 c 102
 Militia Ballots Suspension Act 1862 c 77
 Militia Pay Act 1862 c 80
 Mutiny Act 1862 c 5
 Naval and Victualling Stores Act 1862 c 64
 Netley Hospital Estate Act 1862 c 16
 New Zealand Constitution Act 1862 c 48
 Officers' Commissions Act 1862 c 4
 Oxford University Act 1862 c 26
 Parliamentary Elections Act 1862 c 95
 Parochial Buildings (Scotland) Act 1862 c 58
 Peace Preservation (Ireland) Act Continuance Act 1862 c 24
 Perpetuation of Matrimonial Causes Act, 1860 Act 1862 c 81
 Petroleum Act 1862 c 66
 Pier and Harbour Orders Confirmation Act 1862 c 51
 Poaching Prevention Act 1862 c 114
 Poor Law (Certified Schools) Act 1862 c 43
 Poor Rates Recovery Act 1862 c 82
 Poor Relief (Ireland) Act 1862 c 83
 Poor Removal Act 1862 c 113
 Protection of Inventions and Designs Amendment Act 1862 c 12
 Provisional Orders Confirmation (Turnpikes) Act 1862 c 56
 Public Houses Acts Amendment (Scotland) Act 1862 c 35
 Queen's Prison Discontinuance Act 1862 c 104
 Red Sea and India Telegraph Company Act 1862 c 39
 Revenue Act 1862 or the Customs and Inland Revenue Act 1862 c 22
 Rifle Volunteer Grounds Act 1862 c 41
 Royal Arsenals, etc. Act 1862 c 78
 Sale of Her Majesty's Bakehouse in Windsor Act 1862 c 57
 Sale of Spirits Act 1862 c 38
 Salmon Fisheries (Scotland) Act 1862 c 97
 Sandhurst Vesting Act 1862 c 33. Sometimes called the Sandhurst Act 1862.
 Savings Banks (Ireland) Continuance Act 1862 c 75
 Second Annual Inclosure Act 1862 c 94
 Sir J. Soane's Museum Act 1862 c 9
 Summary Jurisdiction (Ireland) Act 1862 c 50
 Summary Procedure on Bills of Exchange (Ireland) Act 1862 c 23
 Supply Act 1862 c 2
 Thames Embankment Act 1862 c 93
 Transmission of Moveable Property (Scotland) Act 1862 c 85
 Union Assessment Committee Act 1862 c 103
 Union Relief Aid Act 1862 c 110
 Universities (Scotland) Act 1862 c 28
 Unlawful Oaths (Ireland) Act 1862 c 32
 Weights and Measures (Ireland) Amendment Act 1862 c 76
 West Indian Incumbered Estates Act 1862 c 45
 Westminster Offices Act 1862 c 74
 Whipping Act 1862 c 18

1863 (26 & 27 Vict.)

Public General Acts

 African Slave Trade Treaty Act 1863 c 34
 Alkali Act 1863 c 124
 Annual Inclosure Act 1863 c 18
 Annual Turnpike Acts Continuance Act 1863 c 94
 Annuities (Prince of Wales, etc.) Act 1863 c 1
 Appropriation Act 1863 c 99
 Bakehouse Regulation Act 1863 c 40
 Bastardy (Ireland) Act 1863 c 21
 Bills and Notes, Metropolis Act 1863 c 2
 Bleaching and Dyeing Works Act Amendment Act 1863 c 38
 British Columbia Boundaries Act 1863 c 83
 Cayman Islands Act 1863 c 31
 Charity Lands Act 1863 c 106
 Church of Ireland Act 1863 c 123
 Church of Scotland Courts Act 1863 c 47
 Church Services (Wales) Act 1863 c 82
 Clergymen Ordained Abroad Act 1863 c 121
 Colonial Acts Confirmation Act 1863 c 84
 Colonial Letters Patent Act 1863 c 76
 Companies Clauses Act 1863 c 118
 Consolidated Fund (£10,000,000) Act  c 6
 Consolidated Fund (£20,000,000) Act  c 15
 Corrupt Practices Prevention Act 1863 c 29
 Customs and Inland Revenue Act 1863 c 22
 Dockyards Protection Act Amendment Act 1863 c 30
 Dogs (Scotland) Act 1863 c 100
 Drainage and Improvement of Lands Act (Ireland) 1863 c 88. Sometimes called the Drainage and Improvement of Lands (Ireland) Act 1863
 Duchy of Cornwall Management Act 1863 c 49
 Elections in Recess Act 1863 c 20
 Exchequer Bonds Act 1863 c 16
 Excise Duty on Malt Act 1863 c 3
 Exhibition Medals Act 1863 c 119
 Expiring Laws Continuance Act 1863 c 95
 Fortification for Royal Arsenals, etc. Act 1863 c 80
 Garrotters Act 1863 c 44
 General Police and Improvement (Scotland) Supplemental Act 1862 c 60. Repealed by Statute Law (Repeals) Act 1981.
 Gratuitous Trustees (Scotland) Act 1863 c 115
 Greenwich Hospital (Provision for Widows) Act 1863 c 67
 Harwich Harbour Act 1863 c 71
 Highway Act 1863 c 61
 Howth Harbour Act 1863 c 72
 Indemnity Act 1863 c 107
 India Stock Certificate Act 1863 c 73
 Innkeepers' Liability Act 1863 c 41
 Isle of Man Harbours Act 1863 c 86
 Land Drainage Act (Ireland) 1863 c 26. Sometimes called the Land Drainage (Ireland) Act 1863.
 Land Drainage Supplemental Act 1863 c 63
 Land Tax Commissioners (Appointment) Act 1863 c 101
 Loan Act 1863 c 56
 Local Government Act Amendment Act 1863 c 17. Sometimes called the Local Government Amendment Act 1863.
 Local Government Supplemental Act 1863 c 32
 Local Government Supplemental Act 1863 (No. 2) c 64
 London Coal and Wine Duties Continuance Act 1863 c 46
 London Diocese Act 1863 c 36
 Lord Chancellor's Augmentation Act 1863 c 120
 Lunacy Acts Amendment Act 1863 c 110
 Manufactured Tobacco Act 1863 c 7
 Marine Mutiny Act 1863 c 9
 Marriage Law (Ireland) Amendment Act 1863 c 27
 Metropolis Improvement Act 1863 c 45
 Metropolis Roads Act 1863 c 78
 Metropolitan Main Drainage Extension Act 1863 c 68
 Militia Ballots Suspension Act 1863 c 53
 Militia Pay Act 1863 c 37
 Misappropriation by Servants Act 1863 c 103
 Mutiny Act 1863 c 8
 Mutiny, East Indies Act 1863 c 48
 Naval Coast Volunteers Act 1863 c 5
 Naval Medical, etc., Society Act 1863 c 111
 Navy Prize Agents Act 1863 c 116
 New Zealand Boundaries Act 1863 c 23
 Nuisances Removal Act for England (Amendment) Act 1863 c 117
 Oaths Relief in Criminal Proceedings (Scotland) Act 1863 c 85
 Officers of Royal Naval Reserve Act 1863 c 69
 Passengers Act Amendment Act 1863 c 51
 Petty Sessions (Ireland) Amendment Act 1863 c 96
 Pier and Harbour Orders Confirmation Act 1863 c 104
 Poisoned Grain Prohibition Act 1863 c 113
 Poor Law Board Continuance Act 1863 c 55
 Poor Removal Act 1863 c 89
 Post Office Lands Act 1863 c 43
 Post Office Savings Bank Act 1863 c 14
 Power to Alter the Circuits of Judges Act 1863 c 122
 Prison Ministers Act 1863 c 79
 Prisoners Removal (Scotland) Act 1863 c 109
 Prisons (Ireland) Act 1863 c 66
 Promissory Notes Act 1863 c 105
 Provisional Order Confirmation (Turnpikes) Act 1863 c 98
 Public Works (Manufacturing Districts) Act 1863 c 70. Sometimes called the Public Works Act 1863.
 Public Works and Fisheries Acts Amendment Act 1863 c 81
 Railways Clauses Act 1863 c 92
 Reduction of Duty on Rum Act 1863 c 102
 Regimental Debts Act 1863 c 57
 Registration of Births and Deaths (Ireland) Act 1863 c 11
 Registration of Marriages (Ireland) Act 1863 c 90
 Revenue Act 1863 c 33
 Ruthin Charities Act 1863 c 59
 Sale of Hares (Ireland) Act 1863 c 19
 Sale of Mill Sites, etc. (Ireland) Act 1863 c 42
 Salmon Acts Amendment Act 1863 c 10
 Salmon Fisheries (Scotland) Act 1863 c 50
 Salmon Fishery (Ireland) Act 1863 c 114
 Savings Bank Investment Act 1863 c 25
 Second Annual Inclosure Act 1863 c 39
 Secretary at War Abolition Act 1863 c 12
 Seizure of Crops (Ireland) Act 1863 c 62
 Sir R. Hitcham's Charity: Suffolk and Essex Act 1863 c 58
 South Africa Offences Act 1863 c 35
 Statute Law Revision Act 1863 c 125
 Stipendiary Magistrates Act 1863 c 97
 Stock Certificate Act 1863 c 28
 Summary Jurisdiction Act 1863 c 77
 Sydney Branch Mint Act 1863 c 74
 Telegraph Act 1863 c 112
 Thames Embankment Act 1863 c 75
 Town Gardens Protection Act 1863 c 13
 Trustee Savings Banks Act 1863 c 87
 Union Relief Aid Act 1863 c 91
 Union Relief Aid Continuance Act 1863 c 4
 Vaccination (Ireland) Act 1863 c 52
 Vaccination (Scotland) Act 1863 c 108
 Vice Admiralty Courts Act 1863 c 24
 Volunteer Act 1863 c 65
 Walmer Vesting Act 1863 c 54
 Waterworks Clauses Act 1863 c 93

Local Acts
 Rixton and Warburton Bridge Act 1863 c. lxiii

1864 (27 & 28 Vict.)

Public General Acts
 Admiralty Lands and Works Act 1864 c 57
 Annual Inclosure Act 1864 c 1
 Annual Turnpike Acts Continuance Act 1864 c 75
 Annuity to Lady Elgin Act 1864 c 31
 Appointment of a Judge at Bombay Act 1864 c 16
 Army Prize (Shares of Deceased) Act 1864 c 36
 Bank Notes (Ireland) Act 1864 c 78
 Bank Post Bills Composition (Ireland) Act 1864 c 86
 Banking Copartnerships Act 1864 c 32
 Beerhouses (Ireland) Act 1864 c 35
 Bills of Exchange (Ireland) Act 1864 c 7
 Bleaching and Dyeing Works Act Extension Act 1864 c 98
 Cathedrals Act 1864 c 70
 Chain Cable and Anchor Act 1864 c 27
 Charities (Enrolment of Deeds) Act 1864 c 13
 Chief Rents Redemption (Ireland) Act 1864 c 38
 Chimney Sweepers Regulation Act 1864 c 37
Civil Bill Courts Procedure Amendment Act (Ireland) 1864 c 99. Sometimes called the Civil Bill Courts Procedure Amendment (Ireland) Act 1864.
 Clerks of the Peace Removal Act 1864 c 65
 Common Law Procedure Amendment Act (Ireland) 1864 as to County of Cork Juries c 28
 Companies Seals Act 1864 c 19
 Consolidated Fund (Appropriation) Act c 73
 Consolidated Fund (£584,650) Act c 5
 Consolidated Fund (£4,500,000) Act c 6
 Consolidated Fund (£15,000,000) Act c 11
 Contagious Diseases Prevention Act 1864 c 85
 Conveyancers (Ireland) Act 1864 c 8
 Corn Accounts and Returns Act 1864 c 87
 Court of Justiciary (Scotland) Act 1864 c 30
 Coventry Grammar School Act 1864 c 41
 Cranbourne Street Act 1864 c 111
 Defence Act Amendment Act 1864 c 89
 Drainage and Improvement of Lands (Ireland) Act 1864 c 72
 Drainage and Improvement of Lands Supplemental Act, Ireland, 1864 c 107
 Ecclesiastical Courts and Registries Act (Ireland) 1864 c 54. Sometimes called the Ecclesiastical Courts and Registries (Ireland) Act 1864.
 Episcopal Church (Scotland) Act 1864 c 94
 Exchequer Bonds Act 1864 c 74
 Expiring Laws Continuance Act 1864 c 84
 Factory Acts Extension Act 1864 c 48
 Fatal Accidents Act 1864 c 95
 Fish Teinds (Scotland) Act 1864 c 33
 Fortification for Royal Arsenals, etc. Act 1864 c 109
 Game Trespass Act 1864 c 67. Sometimes called the Game Trespass (Ireland) Act 1864.
 Government Annuities Act 1864 c 43
 Government Annuities (Investments) Act 1864 c 46
 Greek Loan Act 1864 c 40
 Hartlepool Pilotage Order Confirmation Act 1864 c 58
 Harwich Harbour Act 1864 c 102
 Highway Act 1864 c 101
 House of Commons (Vacation of Seats) Act 1864 c 34
 Improvement of Land Act 1864 c 114
 Indemnity Act 1864 c 49
 Indian Stock Transfer Act 1864 c 50
 Insane Prisoners Act 1864 c 29
 Ionian States Acts Of Parliament Act 1864 c 77
 Isle of Man Harbours Amendment Act 1864 c 62
 Judgments Act 1864 c 112
 Justices Proceedings Confirmation (Sussex) Act 1864 c 100
 Land Drainage Supplemental Act 1864 c 14
 Lease of College of Physicians Act 1864 c 60
 Limited Penalties Act 1864 c 110
 Local Government Supplemental Act 1864 c 26
 Local Government Supplemental Act 1864 (No. 2) c 83. Sometimes called the Local Government Supplemental (No. 2) Act 1864.
 Lunacy Board (Scotland) Act 1864 c 59
 Malt for Feeding Animals Act 1864 c 9
 Marine Mutiny Act 1864 c 4
 Matrimonial Causes Act 1864 c 44
 Metric Weights and Measures Act 1864 c 117
 Metropolitan Houseless Poor Act 1864 c 116
 Metropolitan Police Act 1864 c 55
 Militia Ballots Suspension Act 1864 c 63
 Militia Pay Act 1864 c 69
 Mutiny Act 1864 c 3
 Naval Agency and Distribution Act 1864 c 24
 Naval and Victualling Stores Act 1864 c 91
 Naval Discipline Act 1864 c 119
 Naval Prize Act 1864 c 25
 Naval Prize Acts Repeal Act 1864 c 23
 New Zealand Loan Guarantee Act 1864 c 82
 Oxford Local Board Act 1864 c 68
 Penal Servitude Act 1864 c 47
 Pier and Harbour Orders Confirmation Act 1864 c 93
 Poisoned Flesh Prohibition Act 1864 c 115
 Poor Law Officers Superannuation Act 1864 c 42
 Poor Removal Act 1864 c 105
 Portsmouth Dockyard Act 1864 c 103
 Promissory Notes (Ireland) Act 1864 c 20
 Provisional Order Confirmation (Turnpikes) Act 1864 c 79
 Public House Closing Act 1864 c 64
 Public Schools Act 1864 c 92
 Public Works (Manufacturing Districts) Act 1864 c 104
 Railway Companies' Powers Act 1864 c 120
 Railways Act (Ireland) 1864 c 71. Sometimes called the Railways (Ireland) Act 1864.
 Railways Construction Facilities Act 1864 c 121
 Registration of Burials Act 1864 c 97
 Registration of County Voters (Ireland) Act 1864 c 22
 Registration of Deeds (Ireland) Act 1864 c 76
 Revenue (No. 1) Act 1864 or the Customs and Inland Revenue Act 1864 c 18
 Revenue (No. 2) Act 1864 c 56
 Revenues of Archbishopric of Armagh Act 1864 c 81
 Salary of Sir J. Lawrence Act 1864 c 2
 Sale of Gas (Scotland) Act 1864 c 96
 Salmon Fisheries (Scotland) Act 1864 c 118
 Second Annual Inclosure Act 1864 c 66
 Settled Estates Act Amendment Act 1864 c 45
 Sheriffs Substitute Act 1864 c 106
 Stamp Act 1864 c 90
 Summary Jurisdiction, Cinque Ports, etc. Act 1864 c 80
 Summary Procedure Act 1864 c 53
 Supreme Court (England) (Officers) Act 1864 c 15
 Thames Conservancy Act 1864 c 113
 Thames Embankment and Metropolis Improvement (Loans) Act 1864  c 61. Sometimes called the Thames Embankment, etc. (Loans) Act 1864.
 Under Secretaries of State Indemnity Act 1864 c 21
 Union Assessment Committee Amendment Act 1864 c 39
 Union Relief Aid Continuance Act 1864 c 10
 Valuation (Ireland) Act 1864 c 52
 Vestry Cess. Abolition (Ireland) Act 1864 c 17
 Warehousing of British Spirits Act 1864 c 12
 West Indian Incumbered Estates Act 1864 c 108
 Westminster Bridge Act 1864 c 88
 Westminster Offices Act 1864 c 51

Local Acts
 Caernarvon and Llanberis Railway Act 1864 c. clxxxvi

1865 (28 & 29 Vict.)

 Admiralty Powers, &c. Act 1865 c 124
 Admiralty, &c. Acts Repeal Act 1865 c 112
 Affirmations (Scotland) Act 1865 c 9
 Annual Inclosure Act 1865 c 20
 Annual Turnpike Acts Continuance Act 1865 c 107
 Appropriation Act 1865 c 123
 Bank of Ireland Act 1865 c 16
 British Kaffraria Act 1865 c 5
 Carriers Act Amendment Act 1865 c 94
 Civil Bill Court (Ireland) Act 1865 c 1
 Clerical Subscription Act 1865 c 122
 Colonial Docks Loans Act 1865 c 106
 Colonial Governors (Pensions) Act 1865 c 113
 Colonial Laws Validity Act 1865 c 63
 Colonial Marriages Act 1865 c 64
 Colonial Naval Defence Act 1865 c 14
 Commissioners of Supply Meetings (Scotland) Act 1865 c 38
 Common Law Courts (Fees) Act 1865 c 45
 Comptroller of the Exchequer, etc. Act 1865 c 93
 Consolidated Fund (£175,650) Act c 4 (An Act to apply the Sum of One hundred and seventy-five thousand six hundred and fifty Pounds out of the Consolidated Fund to the Service of the Year ending the Thirty-first Day of March One thousand eight hundred and sixty-five).
 Consolidated Fund (£15,000,000) Act c 10
 Constabulary (Ireland) Amendment Act 1865 c 70
 County Courts Act 1865 c 99. Sometimes called the County Courts Equity Jurisdiction Act 1865.
 County of Sussex Act 1865 c 37
 County Voters Registration Act 1865 c 36
 Courts of Justice Building Act 1865 c 48
 Courts of Justice Concentration (Site) Act 1865 c 49
 Criminal Procedure Act 1865 c 18 or Denman's Act
 Crown Suits, &c. Act 1865 c 104
 Defence Act 1865 c 65
 District Church Tithes Act 1865 c 42
 Dockyard Extensions Act 1865 c 51
 Dockyard Ports Regulation Act 1865 c 125
 Dogs Act 1865 c 60
 Dogs Regulation (Ireland) Act 1865 c 50
 Drainage and Improvement of Lands Supplemental Act, Ireland 1865 c 13
 Drainage and Improvement of Lands Supplemental Act (No. 2. Ireland) 1865 c 53
 Drainage and Improvement of Lands Amendment Act (Ireland) 1865 c 52. Sometimes called the Drainage and Improvement of Lands Amendment (Ireland) Act 1865.
 Dublin, Sale of Game Act 1865 c 2
 Ecclesiastical Commissioners (Superannuation) Act 1865 c 68
 Ecclesiastical Leases Act 1865 c 57
 Endowment and Augmentation of Small Benefices Act (Ireland) Amendment Act 1865 c 82
 Election Petitions Act 1865 c 8
 Exchequer Bonds Act 1865 c 29
 Excise Duty on Malt Act 1865 c 66
 Expiring Laws Continuance Act 1865 c 119
 Falmouth Gaol Discontinuance Act 1865 c 103. Sometimes called the Falmouth Gaol Act 1865.
 Foreign Jurisdiction Act Amendment Act 1865 c 116
 Fortifications, Royal Arsenals, etc. Act 1865 c 61
 General Police and Improvement (Scotland) Supplemental Act 1865 c 7. Sometimes called the General Police and Improvement (Scotland) Act 1865.
 Government of India Act 1865 c 17
 Greenwich Hospital Act 1865 c 89
 Harbours Transfer Act 1865 c 100. Sometimes called the Harbour Transfer Act 1865.
 Harwich Harbour Act 1865 c 120
 Herring Fisheries (Scotland) Act 1865 c 22
 Indemnity Act 1865 c 97
 India Office Site and Approaches Act 1865 c 32
 Indian High Courts Act 1865 c 15
 Industrial Exhibitions Act 1865 c 3
 Irish Bankrupt and Insolvent Amendment Act 1865 c 21
 Isle of Man Disafforestation (Compensation Payment) Act 1865 c 28
 Kingstown Harbour Act 1865 c 67
 Lancaster Palatine Court Act 1865 c 40
 Land Debentures (Ireland) Act 1865 c 101
 Land Drainage Supplemental Act 1865 c 23
 Law of Partnership Act 1865 c 86
 Local Government Supplemental Act 1865 c 24
 Local Government Supplemental Act 1865 (No. 2) c 25. Sometimes called the Local Government Supplemental (No. 2) Act 1865.
Local Government Supplemental Act 1865 (No. 3) c 41. Sometimes called the Local Government Supplemental (No. 3) Act 1865.
 Local Government Supplemental Act 1865 (No. 4) c 110. Sometimes called the Local Government Supplemental (No. 4) Act 1865.
 Local Government Supplemental Act 1865 (No. 5) c 108. Sometimes called the Local Government Supplemental (No. 5) Act 1865
 Locomotives Act 1865 c 83
 Lunacy Act Amendment Act 1865 c 80
 Marine Mutiny Act 1865 c 12
 Marriages at St. James's Chapel, Eastbury Act 1865 c 81
 Married Women's Property (Ireland) Act 1865 c 43
 Metropolitan Fire Brigade Act 1865 c 90
 Metropolitan Houseless Poor Act 1865 c 34
 Metropolitan Main Drainage Extension Act 1865 c 19
 Militia (Ballot Suspension) Act 1865 c 46
 Militia Pay Act 1865 c 47
 Mortgage Debenture Act 1865 c 78
 Mutiny Act 1865 c 11
 National Gallery (Amendment) Act 1865 c 71. Sometimes called the Dublin National Gallery Act 1865.
 Naval and Marine Pay and Pensions Act 1865 c 73
 Naval Discipline Act Amendment Act 1865 c 115
 Navy and Marines (Property of Deceased) Act 1865 c 111
 Navy and Marines (Wills) Act 1865 c 72
 Oxford University, Vinerian Foundation, Act 1865 c 55
 Parliamentary Costs Act 1865 c 27
 Parliamentary Elections (Scotland) Act 1865 c 92
 Parsonages Act 1865 c 69
 Peace Preservation (Ireland) Continuance Act 1865 c 118
 Pheasants (Ireland) Act 1865 c 54
 Pier and Harbour Orders Confirmation Act 1865 c 58
 Pier and Harbour Orders Confirmation Act 1865 (No. 2) c 114
 Pier and Harbour Orders Confirmation Act 1865 (No. 3) c 76
 Police Superannuation Act 1865 c 35
 Poor Law Board Continuance Act 1865 c 105
 Poor Rates (Scotland) Act 1865 c 62
 Post Office Extension Act 1865 c 87
 Prison Act 1865 c 126
 Prisons (Scotland) Act 1865 c 84
 Procurators (Scotland) Act 1865 c 85
 Protection of Inventions and Designs Amendment Act 1865 c 6
 Public House Closing Act 1865 c 77
 Public Offices Act 1865 c 31
 Record of Title Act (Ireland) 1865 c 88. Sometimes called the Record of Title (Ireland) Act 1865.
 Revenue Act 1865 or the Customs and Inland Revenue Act 1865 c 30
 Revenue (No. 2) Act 1865 c 96
 Rochdale Vicarage Appointment Act 1865 c 117
 Salmon Fishery Act 1865 c 121
 Second Annual Inclosure Act 1865 c 39
 Sewage Utilization Act 1865 c 75
 Small Penalties Act 1865 c 127
 Smoke Nuisance (Scotland) Act 1865 c 102
 Sugar Duties and Drawbacks Act 1865 c 95. Sometimes called the Duties on Sugar Act 1865.
 (Sunderland) Pilotage Order Confirmation Act 1865 c 59
 Trespass (Scotland) Act 1865 c 56
 Turnpikes, Provisional Orders Confirmation Act 1865 c 91
 (Tyne) Pilotage Order Confirmation Act 1865 c 44
 Ulster Canal Act 1865 c 109
 Union Chargeability Act 1865 c 79
 Union Officers Superannuation (Ireland) Act 1865 c 26
Vagrancy, Ireland, Amendment Act (1865) c 33. Sometimes called the Vagrance (Ireland) Amendment Act 1865.
 War Department Tramway (Devon) Act 1865 c 74
 Warehousing of British Compounded Spirits Act 1865 c 98

1866 (29 & 30 Vict.)

 Annual Inclosure Act 1866 c 29
 Annual Turnpike Acts Continuance Act 1866 c 105. Sometimes called the Turnpike Acts Continuance Act 1866.
 Annuity, Duke of Edinburgh Act 1866 c 8 
 Annuity, Princess Helena Act 1866 c 7 
 Annuity, Princess Mary of Cambridge Act 1866 c 48 
 Appropriation Act 1866 c 91 
 Art Act 1866 c 16 
 Attorneys and Solicitors Act (Ireland) 1866 c 84. Sometimes called the Attorneys and Solicitors (Ireland) Act 1866.
 Belfast Constabulary Act 1866 c 46 
 Bills of Sale Act 1866 c 96 
 British Columbia Act 1866 c 67 
 Burial in Burghs (Scotland) Act 1866 c 50) 
 Carriage and Deposit of dangerous Goods Act 1866 c 69 
 Cattle Assurance Act 1866 c 34 
 Cattle Disease Act 1866 c 15
 Cattle Disease Act (Ireland) 1866 c 4. Sometimes called the Cattle Disease (Ireland) Act 1866 
 Cattle Diseases Prevention Act 1866 c 2 
 Cattle Diseases Prevention Amendment Act 1866 c 110
 Cattle Sheds in Burghs (Scotland) Act 1866 c 17 
 Charitable Trusts Deeds Enrolment Act 1866 c 57 
 Colonial Branch Mint Act 1866 c 65 
 Common Law Courts (Fees and Salaries) Act 1866 c 101 
 Constabulary (Ireland) Act 1866 c 103
 Contagious Diseases Act 1866 c 35
 County Courts Act 1866 c 14
 County Rate Act 1866 c 78 
 Courts of Justice Act 1866 c 63 
 Crown Lands Act 1866 c 62
 Declarations Before Taking Office Act 1866 c 22
 Drainage Maintenance Act 1866 c 49
 Drainage and Improvement of Land (Ireland) Act 1866 c 40
 Drainage and Improvement of Lands Supplemental Act (Ireland) 1866 c 61. Sometimes called the Drainage and Improvement of Lands Supplemental Act 1866.
 Ecclesiastical Commissioners Act 1866 c 111
 Ecclesiastical Leases (Isle of Man) Act 1866 c 81
 Evidence (Scotland) Act 1866 c 112
 Exchequer Bills and Bonds Act 1866 c 25
 Exchequer and Audit Departments Act 1866 c 39
 Expiring Laws Continuance Act 1866 c 102
 Extradition Act 1866 c 121
 Foreign Jurisdiction Act Amendment Act 1866 c 87
 Forsyth's Indemnity Act 1866 c 20
 General Police and Improvement (Scotland) Supplemental Act 1866 c 93
 Glebe Lands (Scotland) Act 1866 c 71
 Government of New South Wales and Van Diemen's Land Act 1866 c 74
 Habeas Corpus Suspension (Ireland) Act 1866 c 1
 Habeas Corpus Suspension (Ireland) Act 1866 c 119
 Harbour Loans Act 1866 c 30
 Hop (Prevention of Frauds) Act 1866 c 37
 Indemnity Act 1866 c 116
 India Military Funds Act 1866 c 18
 Indian Prize Money Act 1866 c 47
 Industrial Schools Act 1866 c 118
 Inland Revenue Act 1866 c 64
 Isle of Man Customs, Harbours, and Public Purposes Act 1866 c 23
 Jamaica Act 1866 c 12
 Labouring Classes Dwelling Houses Act 1866 c 28
 Labouring Classes Lodging Houses and Dwellings Act (Ireland) 1866  or the Labouring Classes Lodging Houses and Dwellings (Ireland) Act 1866 c 44
 Land Drainage Supplemental Act 1866 c 33
 Land Drainage Supplemental Act 1866 Number 2 c 80
 Land Tax Commissioners (Appointment) Act 1866 c 59
 Landed Estates Court Act 1866 c 99. Sometimes called the Landed Estates Court (Ireland) Act 1866.
 Landed Property Improvement (Ireland) Act 1866 c 26
 Life Insurance (Ireland) Act 1866 c 42
 Local Government Supplemental Act 1866 c 24
 Local Government Supplemental Act 1866 (No. 2) c 79. Sometimes called the Local Government Supplemental (No. 2) Act 1866.
 Local Government Supplemental Act 1866 (No. 3) c 106. Sometimes called the Local Government Supplemental (No. 3) Act 1866.
 Local Government Supplemental Act 1866 (No. 4) c 107. Sometimes called the Local Government Supplemental (No. 4) Act 1866. 
 Lunacy (Scotland) Act 1866 c 51
 Marine Mutiny Act 1866 c 10
 Matrimonial Causes Act 1866 c 32
 Metropolitan Commons Act 1866 c 122
 Militia Pay Act 1866 c 60
 Mutiny Act 1866 c 9
 National Debt Reduction Act 1866 c 11
 National Gallery Enlargement Act 1866 c 83
 Naval Discipline Act 1866 c 109
 Naval Savings Banks Act 1866 c 43
 New Forest Poor Act c 66
 New Zealand Loans Act 1866 c 104
 Nuisances Removal Act (No. 1) 1866 or the Nuisances Removal (No. 1) Act 1866 c 41
 Oyster Beds (Ireland) Act 1866 c 88
 Oyster Fishery (Ireland) Amendment Act 1866 c 97
 Oyster and Mussel Fisheries Act 1866 c 85
 Parishes Quoad Sacra (Scotland) Act 1866 c 77
 Parliamentary Oaths Act 1866 c 19
 Parochial Buildings (Scotland) Act 1866 c 75
 Patriotic Fund Act 1866 c 120
 Pier and Harbour Orders Confirmation Act 1866 c 58
 Pier and Harbour Orders Confirmation Act 1866 (No. 2) c 56
 Piers and Harbours (Ireland) Act 1866 c 45
 Poor Law Amendment Act 1866 or the Poor Law Amendment Act of 1866 c 113
 Poor Persons Burial (Ireland) Act 1866 c 38
 Portsmouth and Chatham Dockyards Act 1866 c 27
 Portsmouth and Chatham Dockyards Act 1866 c 98
 Post Office (Postmaster-General) Act 1866 c 55
 Prisons Act 1866 c 100
 Prosecutions Expenses Act 1866 c 52
 Public Libraries Amendment Act (England and Scotland) 1866 c 114. Sometimes called the Public Libraries Amendment Act 1866.
 Public Offices Fees Act 1866 c 76
 Public Offices Site Act 1866 c 21
 Public Works (Ireland) Act 1866 c 73
 Public Works Loans Act 1866 c 72)
 Railway Companies (Ireland) Temporary Advances Act 1866 c 95
 Railway Companies Securities Act 1866 c 108
 Reformatory Schools Act 1866 c 117
 Revenue Act 1866 c 36
 Revising Barristers Act 1866 c 54
 Rochdale Vicarage Act 1866 c 86
 Sanitary Act 1866 c 90
 Savings Bank Investment Act 1866 c 5
 Second Annual Inclosure Act 1866 c 94
 Sheriff Court Houses (Scotland) Act 1866 c 53
 Standards of Weights, Measures, and Coinage Act 1866 c 82
 Straits Settlements Act 1866 c 115
 Superannuation Act 1866 c 68
 Superannuation (Metropolis) Act 1866 c 31
 Supply Act 1866 c 6
 Supply Act 1866 c 13 
 Telegraph Act Amendment Act 1866 c. 3
 Thames Navigation Act 1866 c 89 
 Turnpikes, Provisional Orders Confirmation Act 1866 c 92 
 Walmore and Bearce Commons, Forest of Dean Act 1866 c 70

1867

29 & 30 Vict.

 Windsor Barracks Act 1867 c 109

30 & 31 Vict.

Public General Acts
 Agricultural Gangs Act 1867 c 130
 Annual Inclosure Act 1867 c 20
 Annual Turnpike Acts Continuance Act 1867 c 121
 Appropriation Act 1867 c 120
 Army Enlistment Act 1867 c 34
 Banking Companies' (Shares) Act 1867 c 29
 Barrack Lane, Windsor Act 1867 c 109
 Blackwater Bridge Act 1867 c 57
 Board of Trade (Parliamentary Secretary) Act 1867 c 72
 Bridges (Ireland) Act 1867 c 50
 British North America Act 1867 c 3 (known in Canada as the Constitution Act, 1867)
 Bunhill Fields Burial Ground Act 1867 c 38
 Canada Railway Loan Act 1867 c 16
 Chancery (Ireland) Act 1867 c 44
 Chancery and Common Law Offices (Ireland) Act 1867 c 129
 Charitable Donations and Bequests (Ireland) Act 1867 or the Charitable Donations and Bequests Act (Ireland) 1867 c 54
 Chatham and Sheerness Stipendiary Magistrate Act 1867 c 63
 Chester Courts Act 1867 c 36
 Christ Church, Oxford, Act 1867 c. 76
 Church Temporalities (Ireland) Act 1867 c 137
 Common Law Chambers Act 1867 c 68
 Companies Act 1867 c 131
 Consecration of Churchyards Act 1867 c 133
 Consolidated Fund (£369,118 5s. 6d.) Act c 4. Sometimes called the Supply Act 1867.
 Consolidated Fund (£7,924,000) Act c 7
 Contagious Diseases (Animals) Act 1867 c 125
 Councils of Conciliation Act 1867 c 105
 County Courts Act 1867 c 142
 County Treasurers (Ireland) Act 1867 c 46
 Court of Admiralty (Ireland) Act 1867 c 114
 Court of Appeal in Chancery Act 1867 c 64
 Court of Chancery (Officers) Act 1867 c 87
 Courts of Law Fees Act 1867 c 122
 Criminal Law Amendment Act 1867 c 35
 Criminal Lunatics Act 1867 c 12
 Customs Amendment Act 1867 c 82. Sometimes called the Customs Revenue Act.
 Customs and Inland Revenue Act 1867 c 23
 Debts Recovery (Scotland) Act 1867 c 96
 Dog Licences Act 1867 c 5
 Dogs (Ireland) Act 1867 c 116
 Dominica Loan Act 1867 c 91
 Drainage and Improvement of Lands Supplemental Act (Ireland) 1867 c 43
 Drainage and Improvement of Lands Supplemental Act (Ireland) 1867 or the Drainage and Improvement of Lands Supplemental Act (Ireland) (No. 2) 1867 c 139
 Dublin Police Act 1867 c 95
 Ecclesiastical Fees Act 1867 c 135
 Edinburgh Provisional Order Confirmation Act 1867 c 58
 Exchequer Bonds Act 1867 c 31
 Expenses of Fortifications for Protecting Royal Arsenals (No. 1) Act 1867 c 24
 Expenses of Fortifications for Protecting Royal Arsenals (No. 2) Act 1867 c 145
 Expiring Laws Continuance Act 1867 c 143
 Factory Acts Extension Act 1867 c 103
 Galashiels Act 1867 c 85
 Galway Harbour (Composition of Debt) Act 1867 c 56. Sometimes called the Galway Harbour Act 1867.
General Police and Improvement (Scotland) Supplemental Act 1867 c 79. Sometimes called the General Police and Improvement (Scotland) Act 1867 or the Dundee Provisional Order[s] Confirmation Act.
 Guarantee by Companies Act 1867 c 108
 Habeas Corpus Suspension (Ireland) Act 1867 c 1
 Habeas Corpus Suspension (Ireland) Act 1867 c 25
 Herring Fisheries (Scotland) Act 1867 c 52
 Houses of Parliament Act 1867 c 40
 Hypothec Amendment (Scotland) Act 1867 c 42
 Indemnity Act 1867 c 88
 Industrial and Provident Societies Act 1867 c 117
 Investments of Trust Funds Act 1867 c 132
 Isle of Man Customs Duties Act 1867 c 86
 Justices of the Peace Act 1867 c 115
 Labouring Classes Dwelling Houses Act 1867 c 28
 Land Drainage Supplemental Act 1867 c 22
 Land Tax Commissioners Act 1867 c 51
 Limerick Harbour (Composition of Debt) Act 1867 c 53.
 Lis Pendens Act 1867 c 47
 Local Government Supplemental Act 1867 c 21
 Local Government Supplemental Act 1867 (No. 2) c 65. Sometimes called the Local Government Supplemental (No. 2) Act 1867
 Local Government Supplemental Act 1867 (No. 3) c. 49. Sometimes called the Local Government Supplemental (No. 3) Act.
 Local Government Supplemental Act 1867 (No. 4) c 67. Sometimes called the Local Government Supplemental (No. 4) Act.
 Local Government Supplemental Act 1867 (No. 5) c 83. Sometimes called the Local Government Supplemental (No. 5) Act 1867.
 Local Government Supplemental Act 1867 (No. 6) c 123. Sometimes called the Local Government Supplemental (No. 6) Act 1867.
 Lunacy (Ireland) Act 1867 c 118
 Lunatics (Scotland) Act 1867 c 55
 Lyon King of Arms Act 1867 c 17
 Marine Mutiny Act 1867 c 14
 Master and Servant Act 1867 c 141
 Merchant Shipping Act 1867 c 124
 Metropolitan Police (Receiver) Act 1867 c 39
 Metropolitan Poor Act 1867 c 6
 Metropolitan Streets Act 1867 c 134
 Militia Pay Act 1867 c 92
 Militia Reserve Act 1867 c 111
 Morro Velho Marriage Act 1867 c 93
 Mutiny Act 1867 c 13
 National Debt Act 1867 c 26
 National Gallery Enlargement Act 1867 c 41
 Naval Knights of Windsor Act 1867 c 100
 Naval Stores Act 1867 c 119
 Odessa Marriage Act 1867 c 2
 Office and Oath Act 1867 c 75
 Oyster Preservation Act 1867 c 18
 Parliamentary Costs Act 1867 c 136
 Patriotic Fund Act 1867 c 98
 Petty Sessions (Ireland) Act 1867 c 19
 Pier and Harbour Orders Confirmation Act 1867 c 33
 Pier and Harbour Orders Confirmation Act 1867 (No. 2) c 73
 Pier and Harbour Orders Confirmation Act 1867 (No. 3) c 61
 Policies of Assurance Act 1867 c 144
 Poor Law Amendment Act 1867 c 106
 Prorogation Act 1867 c 81
 Public Health (Scotland) Act 1867 c 101
 Public Libraries Act (Scotland) 1867 c 37. Sometimes called the Public Libraries (Scotland) Act 1867
 Public Records (Ireland) Act 1867 c 70
 Public Works (Ireland) Act 1867 c 112
 Public Works Loans Act 1867 c 32
 Railway Companies Act 1867 c 127
 Railway Companies (Ireland) Temporary Advances Act 1867 c 138
 Railway Companies (Scotland) Act 1867 c 126
 Railways (Ireland) Act 1867 c 104
 Real Estate Charges Act 1867 c 69
 Recovery of Alimony (Ireland) Act 1867 c 11 
 Reduction of Annuity Tax Act 1867 c 107
 Representation of the People Act 1867 c 102
 Reserve Force Act 1867 c 110
 Revenue Act 1867 c 90
 Royal Military Canal Act 1867 c 140
 Sale of Land by Auction Act 1867 c 48
 School of Physic (Ireland) Amendment Act 1867 c 9
 Second Annual Inclosure Act 1867 c 71
 Sewage Utilization Act 1867 c 113
 Shipping Dues Exemption Act 1867 c 15
 Sir John Port's Charity, Repton Act 1867 c 99
 Stamp Duty Composition (Ireland) Act 1867 c 89
 Statute Law Revision Act 1867 c 59
 Sugar Duties Act 1867 c 10. Sometimes called the Duties on Sugar Act 1867.
 Supply Act 1867 c 30
 Test Abolition Act 1867 c 62
 Textile Manufactures (Ireland) Act 1867 c 60
 Trades Union Commission Act 1867 c 8
 Trades Union Commission Act Extension Act 1867 c 74
 Trusts (Scotland) Act 1867 c 97
 Turnpike Trusts Arrangements Act 1867 c 66
 Tyne Pilotage Amendment Act 1867 c 78
 Vaccination Act 1867 c. 84
 Valuation of Lands (Scotland) Amendment Act 1867 c 80
 Vice-Admiralty Courts Act Amendment Act 1867 c 45
 War Department Stores Act 1867 c 128
 Warehoused British Spirits Act 1867 c 27
 Weights and Measures, Dublin Act 1867 c 94
 Wexford Grand Jury Act 1867 c 77
 Workshop Regulation Act 1867 c 146

Local and Personal Acts
 Limerick Harbour Act 1867 c. clv

31 & 32 Vict.
 Consolidated Fund (£2,000,000) Act c 1
 Drainage and Improvement of Lands Supplemental Act (Ireland) 1867 or the Drainage and Improvement of Lands Supplemental Act (Ireland) (No. 3) 1867 c 3
 Income Tax Act 1867 c 2
 Metropolitan Streets Act Amendment Act 1867 c 5
 Totnes, &c., Writs Act c 6
 Sales of Reversions Act 1867 c 4

1868 (31 & 32 Vict.)

Public General Acts
 Administration Act 1868 c 90
 Admiralty Suits Act 1868 c 78
 Alkali Act 1868 c 36
 Annual Turnpike Acts Continuance Act 1868 c 99
 Annuity (Lord Napier) Act 1868 c 91
 Appropriation Act 1868 c 85
 Army Chaplains Act 1868 c 83
 Artizans and Labourers Dwellings Act 1868 c 130
 Bank of Bombay Failure Commissioners Act 1868 c 63
 Bankruptcy Amendment Act 1868 c 104
 Borough Clerks of the Peace (Ireland) Act 1868 c 98
 Borough Electors Act 1868 c 41
 Boundary Act 1868 c 46
 Building Sites for Religious and Other Purposes Act 1868 c 44
 Burial (Ireland) Act 1868 c 103
 Capital Punishment Amendment Act 1868 c 24
 Colonial Shipping Act 1868 c 129
 Compulsory Church Rate Abolition Act 1868 c 109
 Confirmation of Marriages, Blakedown Chapel Act 1868 c 113
 Consecration of Churchyards Act 1868 c 47
 Consolidated Fund (£362,398 19s. 9d.) Act c 10
 Consolidated Fund (£6,000,000) Act c 13
 Consular Marriage Act 1868 c 61
 Contagious Diseases (Ireland) Amendment Act 1868 c 80
 Cotton Statistics Act 1868 c 33
 County Courts Admiralty Jurisdiction Act 1868 c 71
 County General Assessment (Scotland) Act 1868 c 82
 Court of Appeal in Chancery Act 1868 c 11
 Court of Chancery and Exchequer Funds (Ireland) Act 1868 c 88
 Court of Session Act 1868 c 100
 Courts of Law Fees (Scotland) Act 1868 c 55
 Curragh of Kildare Act 1868 c 60
 Danube Works Loan Act 1868 c 126
 Dean and Chapter Act 1868 c 19
 Divorce Amendment Act 1868 or the Matrimonial Causes Act 1868 c 77
 Documentary Evidence Act 1868 c 37
 Duchy of Cornwall Management Act 1868 c 35
 Ecclesiastical Buildings and Glebes (Scotland) Act 1868 or the Ecclesiastical Buildings and Glebes (Scotland) Act c 96
 Ecclesiastical Commission Act 1868 c 114
 Endowed Schools Act 1868 c 32
 Entail Amendment (Scotland) Act 1868 c 84
 Exchequer Bonds Act 1868 c 27
 Exchequer Extra Receipts Act 1868 c 9
 Expiring Laws Continuance Act 1868 c 111
 Fairs Act 1868 c 51
 Fairs (Ireland) Act 1868 c 12
 Frampton Mansel Marriage Act 1868 c 23
 General Police and Improvement (Scotland) Act 1862 Amendment Act c 102. Sometimes called the Police and Improvement (Scotland) Act 1868 or the General Police and Improvement (Scotland) Act 1868.
 Habeas Corpus (Ireland) Act 1868 c 7
 Inclosure, &c. Expenses Act 1868 c 89
 Incumbents Act 1868 c 117
 Indian Prize Money Act 1868 c 38
 Indian Railway Companies Act 1868 c 26
 Indictable Offences Act Amendment Act 1868 c 107
 Industrial Schools Act (Ireland) 1868 or the Industrial Schools (Ireland) Act 1868 c 25
 Inland Revenue Act 1868 c 124
 Ionian Islands Commissioners Act 1868 c 128
 Irish Reformatory Schools Act 1868 c 59
 Judgments Extension Act 1868 c 54
 Juries Act (Ireland) 1868 c 75. Sometimes called the Juries (Ireland) Act 1868.
 Jurors Affirmation (Scotland) Act 1868 c 39
 Justiciary Court (Scotland) Act 1868 c 95
 Lanark Prisons Act 1868 or the Prisons (Scotland) Administration Acts (Lanarkshire) Amendment Act 1868 c 50
 Land Registers (Scotland) Act 1868 c 64
 Larceny Act 1868 c 116
 Legislative Council, New Zealand Act 1868 c 57
 Legitimacy Declaration Act (Ireland) 1868 c 20. Sometimes called the Legitimacy Declaration (Ireland) Act 1868
 Libel Act (Ireland) 1868 c 69. Sometimes called the Libel (Ireland) Act 1868.
 Liquidation Act 1868 c 68
 London Coal and Wine Duties Continuance Act 1868 c 17
 London Museum Site Act 1868 c 8
 Lunatic Asylums (Ireland) Accounts Audit Act 1868 c 97
 Marine Mutiny Act 1868 c 15
 Medical Act Amendment Act 1868 c 29
 Medway Regulation Continuance Act 1868 c 53
 Metropolitan Fairs Act 1868 c 106
 Militia Pay Act 1868 c 76
 Municipal Elections Amendment (Scotland) Act 1868 c 108
 Municipal Rate (Edinburgh) Act 1868 c 42
 Mutiny Act 1868 c 14
 New Zealand Company Act 1868 c 93
 Parliamentary Elections Act 1868 c 125
 Parliamentary Electors Registration Act 1868 c 58
 Partition Act 1868 c 40
 Petroleum Act 1868 c 56
 Petty Sessions and Lock-up House Act 1868 c 22
 Pharmacy Act 1868 c 121
 Police Rate Act 1868 c 67
 Policies of Marine Assurance Act 1868 c 86. Sometimes called the Policies of Marine Insurance Act 1868.
 Poor Law Amendment Act 1868 c 122
 Poor Law Inspectors (Ireland) Act 1868 c 74
 Portpatrick, etc., Railways Act 1868 c 81
 Prison Officers Compensation Act 1868 c 21
 Promissory Oaths Act 1868 c 72
 Provinces of New Zealand Act 1868 c 92
 Public Schools Act 1868 c 118
 Railway Companies Act 1868 c 79
 Railway Companies (Ireland) Temporary Advances Act 1868 c 94
 Railways (Extension of Time) Act 1868 c 18
 Railways Traverse Act 1868 or the Railways Traverse Act c 70
 Registration Amendment (Ireland) Act 1868 c 112
 Regulation of Railways Act 1868 c 119
 Renewable Leaseholds Conversion (Ireland) Act 1868 c 62
 Representation of the People (Ireland) Act 1868 c 49
 Representation of the People (Scotland) Act 1868 c 48
 Revenue Act 1868 c 28. Also called the Customs and Income Tax Act 1868.
 Revenue Officers' Disabilities Act 1868 c 73
 Rupert's Land Act 1868 c 105
 Saint Mary Somerset's Church, London Act 1868 c 127
 Salmon Fisheries (Scotland) Act 1868 c 123
 Sanitary Act 1868 c 115
 Sea Fisheries Act 1868 c 45
 Stockbrokers (Ireland) Act 1868 c 31
 Supply Act 1868 c 16
 Telegraph Act 1868 c 110
 Thames Embankment and Metropolis Improvement (Loans) Act 1868 c 43. Sometimes called the Thames Embankment, etc. (Loans) Act 1868.
 Titles to Land Consolidation (Scotland) Act 1868 c 101
 Turnpike Trusts Arrangements Act 1868 c 66
 United Parishes (Scotland) Act 1868 c 30
 Universities Elections Act 1868 c 65. Sometimes called the Universities Election Act 1868.
 Vaccination Amendment (Ireland) Act 1868 c 87
 Vagrant Act Amendment Act 1868 c 52
 West Indies (Salaries) Act 1868 c 120
 Writs Registration (Scotland) Act 1868 c 34

Local Acts
 Gun Barrel Proof Act 1868 c. cxiii
 Oyster Fisheries Orders Confirmation Act 1868 c. ix
 Salford Hundred Court of Record Act 1868 c. cxxx

1869 (32 & 33 Vict.)

 Abandonment of Railways Act 1869 c 114
 Administration of Estates Act 1869 c 46
 Adulteration of Seeds Act 1869 c 112
 Annual Turnpike Acts Continuance Act 1869 c 90
 Appropriation Act 1869 c 93
 Bails Act 1869 c 38
 Bankruptcy Act 1869 c 71
 Bankruptcy Repeal and Insolvent Court Act 1869 c 83
 Basses Lights Act 1869 c 77
 Bishops Resignation Act 1869 c 111
 Borough Recorders' Deputies Act 1869 c 23
 Brazilian Slave Trade Repeal Act 1869 c 2
 Canada (Rupert's Land) Loan Act 1869 c 101
 Charitable Trusts Act 1869 c 110
 Cinque Ports Act 1869 c 53
 Clerks of Assize, &c. Act 1869 c 89
 Colonial Prisoners Removal Act 1869 c 10
 Common Pleas at Lancaster Amendment Act 1869 c 37
 Companies Clauses Act 1869 c 48
 Consolidated Fund (8,406,272l. 13s. 4d.) Act c 1
 Contagious Diseases Act 1869 c 96
 Contagious Diseases (Animals) Act 1869 c 70
 Corrupt Practices Commission Expenses Act 1869 c 21
 Corrupt Practices, Dublin City Act 1869 c 65
 County Courts Admiralty Jurisdiction Amendment Act 1869 c 51
 Courts of Justice (Salaries and Funds) Act 1869 c 91
 Cowgill Parish: Marriages Confirmation, Park Gate Chapel Act 1869 c 30
 Criminal Lunatics Act 1869 c 78
 Customs and Excise Warehousing Act 1869 c 103
 Debtors Act 1869 c 62
 Diplomatic Salaries, &c. Act 1869 c 43
 Dividends and Stock Act 1869 c 104
 Drainage and Improvement of Lands Amendment Act, Ireland 1869 c 72. Sometimes called the Drainage and Improvement of Lands Amendment (Ireland) Act 1869.
 Durham Chancery Act 1869 c 84
 East India Irrigation and Canal Act 1869 c 7
 East India Loan Act 1869 c 106
 Endowed Institutions (Scotland) Act 1869 c 39
 Endowed Schools Act 1869 c 56
 Evidence Further Amendment Act 1869 c 68
 Exchequer Bonds Act 1869 c 22
 Expiring Laws Continuance Act 1869 c 85
 Fisheries (Ireland) Act 1869 c 92
 Fortifications (Expenses) Act 1869 c 76
 Government of India Act 1869 c 97
 Greenwich Hospital Act 1869 c 44
 Habitual Criminals Act 1869 c 99
 Harbour of Galle Loan Act 1869 c 105
 High Constables Act 1869 c 47
 India (Inam Lands) Act 1869 c 29
 Indian Councils Act 1869 c 98
 Irish Church Act 1869 c 42
 Jamaica Loans Act 1869 c 69
 Judicial Statistics (Scotland) Act 1869 c 33
 Juries (Lighthouse Keepers' Exemption) Act 1869 c 36
 Land Tax Commissioners (Appointment) Act 1869 c 64
 Lands Clauses Consolidation Act 1869 c 18
 Local Officers Superannuation Act (Ireland) 1869 or the Local Officers Superannuation (Ireland) Act 1869 c 79
 Local Stamp Act 1869 c 49
 Lord Napier's Salary Act 1869 c 3
 Marine Mutiny Act 1869 c 5
 Medical Officers Superannuation Act (Ireland) 1869 c 50. Sometimes called the Medical Officers Superannuation (Ireland) Act 1869.
 Merchant Shipping (Colonial) Act 1869 c 11
 Metropolitan Board of Works (Loans) Act 1869 c 102
 Metropolitan Building Act 1869 c 82
 Metropolitan Commons Amendment Act 1869 c 107
 Metropolitan Poor Amendment Act 1869 c 63
 Metropolitan Public Carriage Act 1869 c 115
 Militia Act 1869 c 13
 Militia (Ireland) Act 1869 c 80
 Militia Pay Act 1869 c 66
 Millbank Prison Act 1869 c 95
 Municipal Corporation (Elections) Act 1869 c 55. Sometimes called the Municipal Franchise Act 1869.
 Municipal Corporation (Recorders) Act 1869 c 23
 Mutiny Act 1869 c 4
 Naval Stores Act 1869 c 12
 New Parishes Acts and Church Building Acts Amendment Act 1869 c 94
 Newspapers, Printers, and Reading Rooms Repeal Act 1869 c 24
 Nitro Glycerine Act 1869 c 113
 Norfolk Island Bishopric Act 1869 c 16
 Orphan and Deserted Children (Ireland) Act 1869 c 25
 Oxford University Statutes Act 1869 c 20. Sometimes called the University of Oxford Act 1869.
 Oyster and Mussel Fisheries Orders Confirmation Act 1869 (No. 2) or the Oyster and Mussel Fisheries Orders Confirmation (No. 2) Act 1869 c 31
 Parliamentary Returns Act 1869 c 86
 Pensioners Civil Disabilities Relief Act 1869 c 15
 Pensions Commutation Act 1869 c 32
 Pharmacy Act 1869 c 117
 Political Offices Pension Act 1869 c 60
 Poor Rate Assessment and Collection Act 1869 c 41
 Poor Relief (Ireland) Act 1869 c 54
 Prevention of Gaming (Scotland) Act 1869 c 87
 Prisons (Scotland) Amendment Act 1869 c 35
 Public Parks (Ireland) Act 1869 c 28
 Public Schools Act 1869 c 58
 Public Works (Ireland) Act 1869 c 74
 Railway Companies Meetings Act 1869 c 6
 Residence of Incumbents Act 1869 c 109
 Revenue Act 1869 c 14. Also called the Customs and Inland Revenue Duties Act 1869.
 Salmon Fishery (Ireland) Act 1869 c 9
 Sanitary Act 1866 Amendment Act 1869 c 108
 Sanitary Loans Act 1869 c 100
 Savings Bank Investment Act 1869 c 59
 Sea Birds Preservation Act 1869 c 17
 Seamen's Clothing Act 1869 c 57
 Shipping Dues Exemption Act Amendment Act 1869 c 52
 Slave Trade Jurisdiction (Zanzibar) Act 1869 c 75
 Stannaries Act 1869 c 19
 Stipendiary Magistrates' Act 1869 c 34
 Straits Settlements (Ecclesiastical) Act 1869 c 88
 Sunday and Ragged Schools (Exemption from Rating) Act 1869 c 40
 Supply Act 1869 c 8
 Telegraph Act 1869 c 73
 Titles to Land Consolidation (Scotland) Amendment Act 1869 c 116
 Trades Unions Funds Protection Act c 61. Sometimes called the Trades Union Funds Protection Act 1869 or the Trade Union Funds Protection Act 1869 or the Trade Unions Funds Protection Act 1869.
 Trustee Appointment Act 1869 c 26
 Union Loans Act 1869 c 45
 Valuation (Metropolis) Act 1869 c 67
 Volunteer Act 1869 c 81
 Wine and Beerhouse Act 1869 c 27

1870 – 1879

1870 (33 & 34 Vict.)

 Absconding Debtors Act 1870 c 76
 Annual Turnpike Acts Continuance Act 1870 c 73
 Annuity Tax in Edinburgh and Montrose, etc. Act 1870 c 87
 Apportionment Act 1870 c 35
 Appropriation Act 1870 c 96
 Attorneys' and Solicitors' Act 1870 c 28
 Beerhouse Act 1870 c 111
 Bills Confirming Provisional Orders Act 1870 c 1
 Bridgwater and Beverley Disfranchisement Act 1870 c 21
 British Columbia Government Act 1870 c 66
 Burgh Customs (Scotland) Act 1870 c 42
 Canada Defences Loan Act 1870 c 82
 Cattle Disease (Ireland) Amendment Act 1870 c 36
 Census (England) Act 1870 c 107
 Census (Ireland) Act 1870 c 80
 Census (Scotland) Act 1870 c 108
 Charitable Funds Investment Act 1870 c 34
 Church Patronage Act 1870 c 39
 Clerical Disabilities Act 1870 c 91
 Coinage Act 1870 c 10
 Common Law Procedure Amendment Act, Ireland, 1870 c 109
 Consolidated Fund (£9,564,191 7s. 2d.) Act c 5
 Constabulary (Ireland) Amendment Act 1870 c 83
 County Court (Buildings) Act 1870 c 15
 Curragh of Kildare Act 1870 c 74
 Customs (Isle of Man) Act 1870 c 12
 Customs Refined Sugar Duties (Isle of Man) Act 1870 c 43
 Customs and Inland Revenue Act 1870 c 32
 Dissolved Boards of Management and Guardians Act 1870 c 2
 Dividends and Stock Act 1870 c 47
 Dublin Collector-General of Rates Act 1870 c 11
 Dublin Voters Disfranchisement Act 1870 c 54
 East India Contracts Act 1870 c 59
 Elementary Education Act 1870 c 75
 Evidence Amendment Act 1870 c 49
 Exchequer Bonds Act 1870 c 41
 Expiring Laws Continuance Act 1870 c 103
 Extradition Act 1870 c 52
 Factory and Workshop Act 1870 c 62
 Foreign Enlistment Act 1870 c 90
 Forfeiture Act 1870 c 23
 Forgery Act 1870 c 58
 Gas and Water Works Facilities Act 1870 c 70
 Glebe Loan (Ireland) Act 1870 c 112
 Government of India Act 1870 c 3
 Greenwich Hospital Act 1870 c 100
 Gun Licence Act 1870 c 57
 Income Tax Assessment Act 1870 c 4
 Inland Revenue Repeal Act 1870 c 99
 Inverness and Elgin County Boundaries Act 1870 c 16
 Joint Stock Companies Arrangement Act 1870 c 104. Sometimes called the Joint Stock Companies Arrangements Act 1870.
 Judges Jurisdiction Act 1870 c 6
 Juries Act 1870 c 77
 Landlord and Tenant (Ireland) Act 1870 c 46
 Larceny (Advertisements) Act 1870 c 65
 Life Assurance Companies Act 1870 c 61
 Limited Owners Residences Act 1870 c 56
 Liverpool Admiralty District Registrar's Act 1870 c 45
 London Brokers Relief Act 1870 c 60
 Magistrates (Scotland) Act 1870 c 37
 Marine Mutiny Act 1870 c 8
 Married Women's Property Act 1870 c 93
 Matrimonial Causes and Marriage Law (Ireland) Amendment Act 1870 c 110
 Medical Officers Superannuation Act 1870 c 94
 Meeting of Parliament Act 1870 c 81
 Metropolitan Board of Works (Loans) Act 1870 c 24
 Metropolitan Poor Amendment Act 1870 c 18
 Militia Act 1870 c 68
 Mortgage Debenture (Amendment) Act 1870 c 20
 Municipal Elections Amendment (Scotland) Act 1870 c 92
 Mutiny Act 1870 c 7
 National Debt Act 1870 c 71
 Naturalization Act 1870 c 14
 Naturalization Oath Act 1870 c 102
 New Zealand (Roads, &c.) Loan Act 1870 c 40
 Norfolk Boundary Act 1870 c 85
 Norwich Voters Disfranchisement Act 1870 c 25
 Notice Act (Isle of Man) Repeal Act 1870 c 51
 Passengers Act Amendment Act 1870 c 95
 Paupers Conveyance (Expenses) Act 1870 c 48. Sometimes called the Pauper Conveyance (Expenses) Act 1870.
 Peace Preservation (Ireland) Act 1870 c 9
 Pedlars Act 1870 c 72
 Pensions Commutation Act 1870 c 101
 Petty Sessions Clerk (Ireland) Act 1858 Amendment Act 1870 c 64
 Poisons (Ireland) Act 1870 c 26
 Post Office Act 1870 c 79
 Protection of Inventions Act 1870 c 27
 Public Schools Act 1870 c 84
 Queen Anne's Bounty (Superannuation) Act 1870 c 89
 Railways (Powers and Construction) Acts, 1864, Amendment Act 1870 c 19
 Reserve Forces Act 1870 or the Army Enlistment Act 1870 c 67
 Salmon Acts Amendment Act 1870 c 33
 Sanitary Act 1870 c 53
 Sanitary Act (Dublin) Amendment Act 1870 c 106
 Sheriff Courts (Scotland) Act 1870 c 86
 Shipping Dues Exemption Act 1870 c 50
 Siam and Straits Settlements Jurisdiction Act 1870 c 55
 Sligo and Cashel Disfranchisement Act 1870 c 38
 Stamp Act 1870 c 97
 Stamp Duties Management Act 1870 c 98
 Stamp Duty on Certain Leases Act 1870 c 44
 Statute Law Revision Act 1870 c 69
 Supply Act 1870 c 31
 Survey Act 1870 c 13
 Telegraph Act 1870 c 88
 Tramways Act 1870 c 78
 Truck Commission Act 1870 c 105
 Turnpikes Provisional Orders Confirmation Act 1870 c 22
 Wages Arrestment Limitation (Scotland) Act 1870 c 63
 Wages Attachment Abolition Act 1870 c 30
 War Office Act 1870 c 17
 Wine and Beerhouse Act Amendment Act 1870 or the Wine and Beerhouse Amendment Act 1870 c 29

1871 (34 & 35 Vict.)

Public General Acts

 Anatomy Act 1871 c 16
 Annual Turnpike Acts Continuance Act 1871 c 115
 Annuity to Duke of Connaught Act 1871 c 64
 Annuity to Princess Louise Act 1871 c 1
 Appropriation Act 1871 c 89
 Bank Holidays Act 1871 c 17
 Bankruptcy Disqualification Act 1871 c 50
 Bath City Prison Act 1871 c 46
 Beerhouses (Ireland) Act (1864) Amendment Act 1871 c 111
 Bills of Exchange Act 1871 c 74
 British North America Act 1871 c 28 (since 1982, known in Canada as the Constitution Act, 1871)
 Burial Act 1871 c 33
 Chain Cable and Anchor Act 1871 c 101
 Charitable Donations and Bequests Act (Ireland) 1871 c 102. Sometimes called the Charitable Donations and Bequests (Ireland) Act 1871.
 Church Building Acts Amendment Act 1871 c 82
 Citation Amendment (Scotland) Act c 42
 Civil Bill Courts Procedure Amendment Act (Ireland) 1871 c 99. Sometimes called the Civil Bill Courts Procedure Amendment (Ireland) Act 1871.
 College Charter Act 1871 c 63
 Consolidated Fund (£462,580 9s. 11d.) Act c 6
 Consolidated Fund (£5,411,900) Act c 7
 Consolidated Fund (£7,000,000) Act c 20
 Consolidated Fund (£10,000,000) Act  c 51
 County Property Act 1871 c 14
 Courts of Justice (Additional Site) Act 1871 c 57
 Criminal Law Amendment Act 1871 c 32
 Criminal and Dangerous Lunatics (Scotland) Amendment Act 1871 c 55
 Customs and Income Tax Act 1871 c 21
 Dean Forest (Mines) Act 1871 c 85
 Debenture Stock Act 1871 c 27
 Detached Portions of Counties (Ireland) Act 1871 c 106
 Dogs Act 1871 c 56
 Ecclesiastical Dilapidations Act 1871 c 43
 Ecclesiastical Titles Act 1871 c 53
 Election Commissioners Expenses Act 1871 c 61
 Elementary Education (Elections) Act 1871 c 94. Sometimes called the Elementary Education (Election) Act 1871.
 Epping Forest Act 1871 c 93
 Exchequer Bonds Act 1871 c 52
 Expiring Laws Continuance Act 1871 c 95
 Factory and Workshop Act 1871 c 104
 Factory and Workshop (Jews) Act 1871 c 19. Sometimes called the Working of Jews on Sunday Act 1871.
 Fairs Act 1871 c 12
 Gasworks Clauses Act 1871 c 41
 Glasgow Boundaries Act 1871 c 68
 Glebe Loan (Ireland) Amendment Act 1871 c 100
 House Tax Act 1871 c 103
 Income Tax Act 1871 c 5
 Incumbents Resignation Act 1871 c 44
 India Stock Dividends Act 1871 c 29
 Indian Bishops Act 1871 c 62
 Indian Councils Act 1871 c 34
 Industrial and Provident Societies Act 1871 c 80
 Intoxicating Liquors (Licences Suspension) Act 1871 c 88
 Irish Presbyterian Church Act 1871 c 24
 Judgments Registry (Ireland) Act 1871 c 72
 Judicial Committee Act 1871 c 91
 Juries Act 1871 c 2
 Juries Act (Ireland) 1871 c 65. Also called the Juries (Ireland) Act 1871.
 Justices Qualification Act 1871 c 18
 Kingsholm District Act 1871 c 54
 Lancaster County Clerk Act 1871 c 73
 Landlord and Tenant (Ireland) Act 1871 c 92
 Leeward Islands Act 1871 c 107
 Life Assurance Companies Act 1870 c 58
 Limited Owners Residences Act (1870) Amendment Act 1871 c 84
 Local Government (Ireland) Act 1871 c 109
 Local Government Board Act 1871 c 70
 Lodgers' Goods Protection Act 1871 c 79
 Lunacy Regulation (Ireland) Act 1871 c 22
 Marine Mutiny Act 1871 c 10
 Matrimonial Causes and Marriage Law (Ireland) Amendment Act 1871 c 49
 Merchant Shipping Act 1871 c 110
 Metropolis Water Act 1871 c 113
 Metropolitan Board of Works (Loans) Act 1871 c 47
 Metropolitan Building Act 1871 c 39
 Metropolitan Police Court (Buildings) Act 1871 c 35
 Metropolitan Poor Act 1871 c 15
 Metropolitan Tramways Provisional Orders Suspension Act 1871 c 69
 Military Manoeuvres Act 1871 c 97
 Municipal Corporations Act 1859 Amendment Act c 67
 Mutiny Act 1871 c 9
 Norwich Voters Disfranchisement Act 1871 c 77
 Parliamentary Costs Act 1871 c 3
 Parliamentary Witnesses Oaths Act 1871 c 83
 Pauper Inmates Discharge and Regulation Act 1871 c 108
 Pedlars Act 1871 c 96
 Pensions Commutation Act 1871 c 36
 Petroleum Act 1871 c 105
 Poor Law Loans Act 1871 c 11
 Post Office (Duties) Act 1871 c 30
 Prayer Book (Tables of Lessons) Act 1871 c 37
 Prevention of Crimes Act 1871 c 112
 Primitive Wesleyan Methodist Society of Ireland Act 1871 c 40
 Private Chapels Act 1871 c 66
 Promissory Oaths Act 1871 c 48
 Protection of Life and Property in Certain Parts of Ireland Act 1871 c 25
 Public Health (Scotland) Amendment Act 1871 c 38
 Public Libraries Act (Scotland, 1867) Amendment Act 1871 c 59
 Public Libraries Act 1855 Amendment Act 1871 c 71
 Public Parks, Schools, and Museums Act 1871 c 13
 Public Schools Act 1871 c 60
 Rectory of Ewelme Act 1871 c 23
 Reductions Ex Capite Lecti Abolished Act 1871 c 81
 Regulation of Railways Act 1871 c 78
 Regulation of the Forces Act 1871 c 86
 Sequestration Act 1871 c 45
 Stamps Act 1871 c 4
 Statute Law Revision Act 1871 c 116
 Summary Jurisdiction (Ireland) Amendment Act 1871 c 76
 Sunday Observation Prosecution Act 1871 c 87
 Tancred's Charities Act 1871 c 117
 Telegraph (Money) Act 1871 c 75
 Trade Union Act 1871 c 31
 Tramways (Ireland) Amendment Act 1871 c 114
 Union of Benefices Acts Amendment Act c 90
 Universities Tests Act 1871 c 26
 Vaccination Act 1871 c 98
 West Africa Offences Act 1871 c 8

Private Acts
 Lloyd's Act 1871 c. xxi 
 Shotts Iron Company's Act 1871 c. xvii

1872 (35 & 36 Vict.)

Public General Acts
 Act of Uniformity Amendment Act 1872 c 35
 Adulteration of Food and Drugs Act 1872 c 74
 Annual Turnpike Acts Continuance Act 1872 c 85
 Annuity, Lady Mayo Act 1872 c 56
 Appropriation Act 1872 c 87
 Arbitration (Masters and Workmen) Act 1872 c 46
 Attorney and Solicitors Act (1860) Amendment Act 1872 or the Attorneys and Solicitors Act (1860) Amendment Act 1872 c 81
 Ballot Act 1872 c 33
 Bank of England (Election of Directors) Act 1872 c 34
 Bank of Ireland Charter Amendment Act 1872 c 5. Sometimes called the Bank of Ireland Charter Act 1872.
 Bankruptcy (Ireland) Amendment Act 1872 c 58
 Baptismal Fees Abolition Act 1872 c 36
 Basses Lights Act 1872 c 55
 Bastardy Laws Amendment Act 1872 c 65
 Bishops Resignation Act Continuance Act 1872 c 40
 Borough Funds Act 1872 c 91
 Borough and Local Courts of Record Act 1872 c 86
 Cattle Disease (Ireland) Amendment Act 1872 c 16
 Chain Cable and Anchor Act 1872 c 30
 Charitable Trustees Incorporation Act 1872 c 24
 Church Seats Act 1872 c 49
 Coal Mines Regulation Act 1872 c 76
 Colonial Governors (Pensions) Act 1872 c 29
 Commissioners for Oaths (Ireland) Act 1872 c 75
 Corrupt Practices (Municipal Elections) Act 1872 c 60. Sometimes called the Corrupt Practice (Municipal Elections) Act 1872.
 County Boundaries, Ireland, Act 1872 c 48
 County Buildings (Loans) Act 1872 c 7
 Court of Chancery (Funds) Act 1872 c 44
 Customs and Inland Revenue Act 1872 c 20
 Deans and Canons Resignation Act 1872 c 8
 Debtors Act (Ireland) 1872 c 57. Sometimes called the Debtors (Ireland) Act 1872
 Diocesan Boundaries Act 1872 c 14
 Drainage and Improvement of Lands Amendment Act (Ireland) 1872 c 31
 Ecclesiastical Dilapidations Act 1872 c 96
 Education (Scotland) Act 1872 c 62
 Elementary Education (Elections) Act 1872 c 59
 Elementary Education Act Amendment Act 1872 c 27
 Epping Forest Amendment Act 1872 c 95
 Expiring Laws Continuance Act 1872 c 88
 Galashiels and Selkirk Act 1872 c 47
 Grand Jury (Ireland) Act 1872 c 42
 Greenwich Hospital Act 1872 c 67
 Income Tax (Public Offices) Act 1872 c 82
 Infant Life Protection Act 1872 c 38
 Inquiries by Board of Trade Act 1872 c 18
 Irish Church Act 1869 Amendment Act 1872 c 90
 Irish Church Amendment Act 1872 c 13
 Isle of Man Harbours Act 1872 c 23
 Judges Salaries Act 1872 c 51
 Juries (Ireland) Act 1872 c 25
 Kensington Station and North and South London Junction Railway Act 1859 (Repayment of Moneys) Act 1872 c 80
 Landlord and Tenant (Ireland) Act 1872 c 32
 Law Officers Fees Act 1872 c 70
 Licensing Act 1872 c 94
 Life Assurance Companies Act 1872 c 41
 Loan Societies (Ireland) Act 1843 Amendment Act 1872 c 17
 Local Government Board (Ireland) Act 1872 c 69
 Marine Mutiny Act 1872 c 4
 Marriage (Society of Friends) Act 1872 c 10
 Merchant Shipping Act 1872 c 73
 Metalliferous Mines Regulation Act 1872 c 77
 Metropolitan Tramways Provisional Orders Suspension Act 1872 c 43
 Middlesex Grand Juries Act 1872 c 52
 Military Forces Localization Act 1872 c 68. Sometimes called the Military Forces Localisation Act 1872
 Military Manoeuvres Act 1872 c 64
 Mutiny Act 1872 c 3
 Naturalization Act 1872 c 39. Sometimes called the Naturalisation Act 1872.
 Pacific Islanders Protection Act 1872 or the Kidnapping Act 1872 c 19
 Parish Constables Act 1872 c 92
 Parks Regulation Act 1872 c 15
 Party Processions Act (Ireland) Repeal Act 1872 c 22
 Pawnbrokers Act 1872 c 93
 Pensions Commutation Act 1872 c 83
 Poor Law Loans Act 1872 c 2
 Protection of Wild Birds Act 1872 c 78
 Public Health Act 1872 c 79
 Public Parks (Ireland) Act 1869 Amendment Act 1872 c 6
 Public Schools Act 1872 c 54
 Public Works Loan Commissioners Act 1872 c 71
 Queen's Bench (Ireland) Procedure Act 1872 c 28
 Railway Rolling Stock Protection Act 1872 c 50
 Reformatory and Industrial Schools Acts Amendment Act 1872 c 21
 Review of Justices Decisions Act 1872 c 26
 Revising Barristers Act 1872 c 84. Sometimes called the Appointment of Revising Barristers Act 1872.
 Royal Military Canal Act 1872 c 66
 Statute Law Revision Act 1872 c 63
 Statute Law Revision Act 1872 (No. 2) c 97
 Statute Law (Ireland) Revision Act 1872 c 98
 Steam Whistles Act 1872 c 61
 Superannuation Act 1872 c 12
 Supply Act 1872 c 1
 Supply Act 1872 c 11
 Supply Act 1872 c 37
 Treaty of Washington Act 1872 c 45
 Turnpike Trusts Arrangements Act 1872 c 72
 Union Officers (Ireland) Act 1872 c 89
 Victoria Park Act 1872 c 53
 West Indies (Encumbered Estates) Act 1872 c 9

Local Acts
London and North Western Railway (Additional Powers) Act 1872 c. lxxxvii

1873 (36 & 37 Vict.)

Public general acts
 Agricultural Children Act 1873 c 67
 Annual Turnpike Acts Continuance Act 1873 c 90
 Annuity to Duke and Duchess of Edinburgh Act 1873 c 80
 Appropriation Act 1873 c 79
 Australian Colonies Duties Act 1873 c 22
 Bastardy Laws Amendment Act 1873 c 9
 Blackwater Bridge Act 1873 c 46
 Blackwater Bridge Debt Act 1873 c 47
 Cambridge Commissioners Act 1873 c 73
 Canada (Public Works) Loan Act 1873 c 45
 Cathedral Acts Amendment Act 1873 c 39
 Confirmation of Marriages (Cove Chapel) Act 1873 c 1
 Consolidated Fund (Permanent Charges Redemption) Act 1873 c 57
 County Debentures Act 1873 c 35
 County ad City of Dublin Grand Juries Act 1873 c 65
 Crown Lands Act 1873 c 36
 Crown Private Estates Act 1873 c 61
 Custody of Infants Act 1873 c 12
 Customs Sugar Duties (Isle of Man) Act 1873 c 29
 Customs and Inland Revenue Act 1873 c 18
 Defence Acts Amendment Act 1873 c 72
 East India Loan Act 1873 c 32
 East India Stock Dividend Redemption Act 1873 c 17
 Ecclesiastical Commissioners Act 1873 c 64
 Elementary Education Act 1873 c 86
 Endowed Schools Act 1873 c 87. Sometimes called the Endowed Schools Act (1869) Amendment Act 1873.
 Endowed Schools (Time of Address) Act 1873 c 7
 Epping Forest Act 1873 c 5
 Exchequer Bonds Act 1873 c 54
 Expiring Laws Continuance Act 1873 c 75
 Extradition Act 1873 c 60. Sometimes called the Extradition Act (1870) Amendment Act 1873.
 Fairs Act 1873 c 37
 Gas and Water Works Facilities Act 1870 Amendment Act 1873 c 89
 Government Annuities Act 1873 c 44
 Grand Jury (Ireland) Act 1873 c 34
 Highland Schools Act 1873 c 53
 Income Tax Act 1873 c 8
 Indian Railway Companies Act 1873 c 43
 Intestates Act 1873 c 52
 Juries (Ireland) Act 1873 c 27
 Langbaurgh Coroners Act 1873 c 81
 Law Agents (Scotland) Act 1873 c 63
 Marine Mutiny Act 1873 c 11
 Marriage Law (Ireland) Amendment Act 1873 c 16
 Marriages Confirmation (Eton) Act 1873 c 28
 Marriages Confirmation (Fulford Chapel) Act 1873 c 20
 Marriages Confirmation (Gretton Chapel) Act 1873 c 25
 Matrimonial Causes Act 1873 c 31
 Medical Act (University of London) 1873 c 55
 Merchant Shipping Act 1873 c 85
 Military Manoeuvres Act 1873 c 58
 Militia (Lands and Buildings) Act 1873 c 68
 Militia Pay and Storehouses Act 1873 c 84
 Municipal Corporations Evidence Act 1873 c 33
 Mutiny Act 1873 c 10
 Naval Artillery Volunteer Act 1873 c 77
 New Zealand (Roads, &c.) Loan Act 1873 c 15
 Peace Preservation (Ireland) Acts Continuance Act 1873 c 24
 Petitions of Right (Ireland) Act 1873 c 69
 Places of Worship Sites Act 1873 c 50
 Polling Districts (Ireland) Act 1873 c 2
 Poor Allotments Management Act 1873 c 19
 Portpatrick Harbour Act 1873 c 14
 Prison Officers Superannuation (Ireland) Act 1873 c 51
 Public Schools (Eton College Property) Act 1873 c 62
 Public Schools (Shrewsbury and Harrow Schools Property) Act 1873 c 41
 Public Works Loan Act 1872 c 49
 Railway Regulation Act (Returns of Signal Arrangements, Working, &c.) 1873 c 76. Sometimes called the Railway Regulation (Returns of Signal Arrangements, Working, &c.) Act 1873.
 Registration of Voters (Ireland) Act 1873 c 30
 Regulation of Railways Act 1873 c 48
 Revising Barristers Act 1873 c 70
 Royal Irish Constabulary Act 1873 c 74
 Salmon Fishery Act 1873 c 71
 Salmon Fishery Commissioners Act 1873 c 13
 Sanitary Act 1866, Ireland, Amendment Act 1873 c 78
 Slave Trade Act 1873 c 88
 Slave Trade (East African Courts) Act 1873 c 59
 Small Penalties (Ireland) Act 1873 c 82
 Somerset House (King's College Lease) Act 1873 c 4
 Statute Law Revision Act 1873 c 91
 Superannuation Act Amendment Act 1873 c 23
 Supply Act 1873 c 3
 Supply Act 1873 c 26
 Supreme Court of Judicature Act 1873 c 66
 Telegraph Act 1873 c 83
 Thames Embankment Land Act 1873 c 40. Sometimes called the Thames Embankment Act 1873.
 Tithe Commutation Acts Amendment Act 1873 c 42
 Treasury Chest Fund Act 1873 c 56
 Turks and Caicos Islands Act 1873 c 6
 University of Dublin Tests Act 1873 c 21
 Vagrant Act Amendment Act 1873 c 38

Local acts
 Thames Embankment (South) Act 1873 c. vii. Sometimes called the Thames Embankment Act 1873.

Private acts
 Bank of Scotland Act 1873 c. xcix

1874 (37 & 38 Vict.)

 Alderney Harbour (Transfer) Act 1874 c 92
 Alkali Act 1874 c 43
 Annual Turnpike Acts Continuance Act 1874 c 95
 Annuity to Prince Leopold Act 1874 c 65
 Apothecaries Act Amendment Act 1874 c 34
 Appropriation Act 1874 c 56
 Archdeaconries and Rural Deaneries Act 1874 c 63
 Attorneys and Solicitors Act 1874 c 68
 Barrister's Admission, Stamp Duty Act 1874 c 19
 Betting Act 1874 c 15
 Births and Deaths Registration Act 1874 c 88
 Bishop of Calcutta Act 1874 c 13
 Board of Trade Arbitrations, &c. Act 1874 c 40
 Building Societies Act 1874 c 42
 Canadian Stock Stamp Act 1874 c 26
 Cattle Disease (Ireland) Acts Amendment Act 1874 c 6
 Chain Cables and Anchors Act 1874 c 51
 Church Patronage (Scotland) Act 1874 c 82
 Civil Bill Courts (Ireland) Act 1874 c 66
 Colonial Attorneys Relief Act 1874 c 41
 Colonial Clergy Act 1874 c 77
 Conjugal Rights (Scotland) Amendment Act 1874 c 31
 Consolidated Fund (£1,422,797 14s. 6d.) Act c 1
 Consolidated Fund (£7,000,000) Act c 2
 Constabulary (Ireland) Act 1874 c 80. Sometimes called the Irish Constabulary Act 1874 or the Royal Irish Constabulary Act 1874.
 Conveyancing (Scotland) Act 1874 c 94
 County of Hertford and Liberty of St. Alban Act 1874 c 45
 Courts (Colonial) Jurisdiction Act 1874 c 27
 Customs (Isle of Man) Tariff Act 1874 c 46
 Customs and Inland Revenue Act 1874 c 16
 Drainage and Improvement of Lands Amendment Act (Ireland) 1874 c 32. Sometimes called the Drainage and Improvement of Lands Amendment (Ireland) Act 1874.
 East India Annuity Funds Act 1874 c 12
 East India Loan Act 1874 c 3
 Elementary Education (Orders) Act 1874 c 90
 Elementary Education (Wenlock) Act 1874 c 39
 Endowed Schools Act 1874 c 87
 Evidence Further Amendment (Scotland) Act 1874 c 64
 Expiring Laws Continuance Act 1874 c 76
 Factory Act 1874 c 44
 False Personation Act 1874 c 36
 Fines Act (Ireland) 1851 Amendment Act 1874 c 72
 Four Courts Marshalsea Discontinuance Act 1874 c 21
 Foyle College Act 1874 c 79
 Game Birds (Ireland) Act 1874 c 11
 Great Seal (Offices) Act 1874 c 81
 Harbour of Colombo Loan Act 1874 c 24
 Herring Fishery Barrels Act 1874 c 25
 Hertford College Act 1874 c 55
 Holyhead Old Harbour Road Act 1874 c 30
 Hosiery Manufacture (Wages) Act 1874 c 48
 Indian Councils Act 1874 c 91
 Infants Relief Act 1874 c 62
 Irish Reproductive Loan Fund Act 1874 c 86
 Isle of Man Harbours Act 1874 c 8
 Juries (Ireland) Act 1874 c 28
 Land Tax Commissioners (Appointment) Act 1874 c 18
 Leases and Sales of Settled Estates Amendment Act 1874 c 33
 Licensing Act 1874 c 49
 Licensing Act (Ireland) 1874 c 69. Also called the Licensing (Ireland) Act 1874.
 Lough Corrib Navigation Act 1874 c 71
 Marine Mutiny Act 1874 c 5
 Marriages Confirmation (Bentley) Act 1874 c 17
 Marriages Confirmation (Pooley Bridge) Act 1874 c 14
 Married Women's Property Act (1870) Amendment Act 1874 c 50
 Mersey Collisions Act 1874 c 52
 Middlesex Sessions Act 1874 c 7
 Militia Law Amendment Act 1874 c 29
 Mutiny Act 1874 c 4
 Police (Expenses) Act 1874 c 58
 Post Office Savings Banks Act 1874 or the Post Office Savings Bank Act 1874 c 73
 Powers of Appointment Act 1874 c 37
 Prisons Authorities Act 1874 c 47
 Private Lunatic Asylums (Ireland) Act 1874 c 74
 Public Health (Ireland) Act 1874 c 93
 Public Works Loan (School Loans), Act 1874 c 9
 Public Worship Regulation Act 1874 c 85
 Rating Act 1874 c 54
 Rating Exemptions (Scotland) Act 1874 c 20
 Real Property Limitation Act 1874 c 57
 Resident Magistrates and Police Commissioners Salaries Act 1874 c 23
 Revenue Officers' Disabilities Removal Act 1874 c 22
 Revising Barristers Act 1874 c 53
 Royal (late Indian) Ordnance Corps Act 1874 c 61
 Sanitary Law Amendment Act 1874 c 89
 Shannon Act 1874 c 60
 Slaughter-houses, &c. (Metropolis) Act 1874 c 67
 Statute Law Revision Act 1874 c 35
 Statute Law Revision Act 1874 (No. 2) c 96. Sometimes called the Statute Law Revision (No. 2) Act 1874.
 Stocksbridge Railway Act 1874 c 4
 Straits Settlements Offences Act 1874 c 38
 Supply Act 1874 c 10
 Supreme Court of Judicature (Commencement) Act 1874 c 83
 Vaccination Act 1874 c 75
 Valuation (Ireland) Amendment Act 1874 c 70
 Vendor and Purchaser Act 1874 c 78
 Working Men's Dwellings Act 1874 c 59
 Works and Public Buildings Act 1874 c 84

1875 (38 & 39 Vict.)

 Agricultural Holdings (England) Act 1875 c 92
 Appropriation Act 1875 c 78
 Artisan's and Labourers' Dwellings Improvement Act 1875 c 36
 Artisans and Labourers Dwellings Improvement (Scotland) Act 1875 c 49
 Bankruptcy (Scotland) Act 1875 c 26
 Bishopric of Saint Albans Act 1875 c 34
 Bishops Resignation Act 1875 or the Bishops Resignation (1869) Perpetuation Act c 19
 Bridges (Ireland) Act 1875 c 46
 Building Societies Act 1875 c 9
 Canada Copyright Act 1875 c 53
 Chimney Sweepers Act 1875 c 70
 Conspiracy and Protection of Property Act 1875 c 86
 Constables (Scotland) Act 1875 c 47
 Constabulary (Ireland) Act 1875 c 44
 Contagious Diseases (animals) (Scotland) Act 1875 c 75
 Copyright of Designs Act 1875 c 93
 County Courts Act 1875 c 50
 County Surveyors Superannuation Act (Ireland) 1875 c 56. Also called the County Surveyors (Superannuation) Ireland Act 1875.
 Customs and Inland Revenue Act 1875 c 23
 Department of Science and Art Act 1875 c 68
 Dublin Justices Act 1875 c 20
 Ecclesiastical Commissioners Act 1875 c 71
 Ecclesiastical Fees Act 1875 c 76
 Employers and Workmen Act 1875 c 90
 Endowed Schools (Vested Interests) Act Continuance Act 1875 c 29
 Entail Amendment (Scotland) Act 1875 c 61
 Epping Forest Act 1875 c 6
 Expiring Laws Continuance Act 1875 c 72
 Explosives Act 1875 c 17
 Falsification of Accounts Act 1875 c 24
 Foreign Jurisdiction Act 1875 c 85
 Friendly Societies Act 1875 c 60
 Glebe Lands, Representative Church Body, Ireland, Act 1875 c 42
 Glebe Loan (Ireland) Amendment Act 1875 c 30
 Government Officers (Security) Act 1875 c 64
 Holidays Extension Act 1875 c 13
 India Home (appointments) Act 1875 c 73
 International Copyright Act 1875 c 12
 Intestates Act 1875 c 27
 Intestates Widows and Children (Scotland) Act 1875 c 41
 Juries (Ireland) Act 1875 c 37
 Justices Qualification Act 1875 c 54
 Land Transfer Act 1875 c 87
 Leasing Powers Amendment Act for Religious Purposes in Ireland 1875 c 11
 Legal Practitioners Act 1875 c 79
 Local Loans Act 1875 c 83
 Lunatic Asylums (Ireland) Act 1875 c 67
 Marine Mutiny Act 1875 c 8
 Medical Act Royal College of Surgeons of England 1875 c 43
 Merchant Shipping Act 1875 c 88
 Metalliferous Mines Regulation Act 1875 c 39
 Metropolis Management Act 1875 c 33
 Metropolitan Board of Works (Loans) Act 1875 c 65
 Metropolitan Police Magistrates Act 1875 c 3
 Metropolitan Police Staff (Superannuation) Act 1875 c 28
 Militia (Voluntary Enlistment) Act 1875 c 69
 Municipal Elections Act 1875 c 40
 Mutiny Act 1875 c 7
 National School Teachers (Ireland) Act 1875 c 96
 National School Teachers Residences (Ireland) Act 1875 c 82
 Offences against the Person Act 1875 c 94
 Pacific Islanders Protection Act 1875 c 51
 Parliament of Canada Act 1875 c 38
 Parliamentary Elections (Returning Officers) Act 1875 c 84
 Peace Preservation (Ireland) Act 1875 c 14
 Pharmacy Act (Ireland) 1875 c 57. Sometimes called the Pharmacy (Ireland) Act 1875.
 Police (Expenses) Act 1875 c 48
 Post Office Act 1875 c 22
 Public Entertainments Act 1875 c 21
 Public Health Act 1875 c 55
 Public Health (Scotland) Act 1867 Amendment Act 1875 c 74
 Public Records (Ireland) Act 1867 Amendment Act 1875 c 59
 Public Stores Act 1875 c 25
 Public Works Loans Act 1875 c 89
 Public Works Loans (Money) Act 1875 c 58
 Railway Companies Act 1875 c 31
 Regimental Exchange Act 1875 c 16
 Registry of Deeds (Ireland) Act 1875 c 5
 Remission of Penalties Act 1875 c 80
 Sale of Food and Drugs Act 1875 c 63
 Sanitary Law (Dublin) Amendment Act 1875 c 95
 Sea Fisheries Act 1875 c 15
 Seal Fishery Act 1875 c 18
 Sheriff Substitute (Scotland) Act 1875 c 81
 Sinking Fund Act 1875 c 45
 South Wales Turnpike Trusts Amendment Act 1875 c 35
 Statute Law Revision Act 1875 c 66
 Summary Prosecutions Appeals (Scotland) Act 1875 c 62
 Superannuation Act 1875 c 4
 Supply Act 1875 c 1
 Supply Act 1875 c 2
 Supply Act 1875 c 10
 Supreme Court of Judicature Act 1875 c 77
 Survey (Great Britain) Continuance Act 1875 c 32
 Trade Marks Registration Act 1875 c 91
 Washington Treaty (Claims) Act 1875 c 52

1876 (39 & 40 Vict.)

Public General Acts
 Agricultural Holdings (England) Act (1875) Amendment Act 1876 c 74
 Annual Turnpike Acts Continuance Act 1876 c 39
 Appellate Jurisdiction Act 1876 c 59
 Appropriation Act 1876 c 60
 Bankers' Books Evidence Act 1876 c 48
 Bishopric of Truro Act 1876 c 54
 Burgesses Qualification (Scotland) Act 1876 c 12
 Burgh Wards (Scotland) Act 1876 c 25
 Burghs Gas Supply (Scotland) Act 1876 c 49
 Cattle Disease (Ireland) Act 1876 c 51
 Chairman of Quarter Sessions (Ireland) Jurisdiction Act 1876 c 71
 Chelsea Hospital Act 1876 c 14
 Commons Act 1876 c 56
 Consolidated Fund Act (10,029,550l. 5s. 1d.) c 4
 Consolidated Fund Act (11,000,000l.) c 15
 Convict Prisons Returns Act 1876 c 42
 Council of India Act 1876 c 7
 Court of Admiralty (Ireland) Amendment Act 1876 c 28
 Crossed Cheques Act 1876 c 81
 Cruelty to Animals Act 1876 c 77
 Customs Consolidation Act 1876 c 36
 Customs Tariff Act 1876 c 35
 Customs and Inland Revenue Act 1876 c 16
 Divided Parishes and Poor Law Amendment Act 1876 c 61
 Drugging of Animals Act 1876 c 13
 Elementary Education Act 1876 c 79
 Elver Fishing Act 1876 c 34
 Epping Forest Act 1876 c 3
 Exchequer Bonds Act 1876 c 1
 Expiring Laws Continuance Act 1876 c 69
 Friendly Societies Amendment Act 1876 c 32
 Industrial and Provident Societies Act 1876 c 45
 Isle of Man (Officers) Act 1876 c 43
 Juries Procedure (Ireland) Act 1876 c 78
 Jurors Qualification (Ireland) Act 1876 c 21
 Legal Practitioners Act 1876 c 66
 Legal Practitioners (Ireland) Act 1876 c 44
 Local Light Dues Reduction Act 1876 c 27
 Marine Mutiny Act 1876 c 9
 Medical Act 1876 c 41
 Medical Practitioners Act 1876 c 40
 Merchant Shipping Act 1876 c 80
 Metropolitan Board of Works (Loans) Act 1876 c 55
 Municipal Privilege Act, Ireland, 1876 c 76. Also called the Municipal Privilege (Ireland) Act 1876.
 Mutiny Act 1876 c 8
 Norwich and Boston Corrupt Voters Act 1876 c 72
 Notices to Quit (Ireland) Act 1876 c 63
 Nullum Tempus (Ireland) Act 1876 c 37
 Parochial Records Act 1876 c 58
 Partition Act 1876 c 17
 Pauper Children (Ireland) Act 1876 c 38
 Pensions Commutation Act 1876 c 73
 Police (Expenses) Continuance Act 1876 c 64
 Poor Law Rating (Ireland) Act 1876 c 50
 Preservation of Wild Fowl Act 1876 c 29
 Prevention of Crimes Amendment Act 1876 c 23
 Public Works Loans (Money) Act 1876 c 31
 Publicans' Certificates (Scotland) Act 1876 c 26
 Rivers Pollution Prevention Act 1876 c 75
 Royal Titles Act 1876 c 10
 Saint Vincent, Tobago, and Grenada Constitution Act 1876 c 47. Sometimes called the St. Vincent and Grenada Constitution Act 1876.
 Sale of Exhausted Parish Lands Act 1876 c 62
 Salmon Fisheries Act 1876 or the Salmon Fishery Act 1876 c 19
 Savings Bank (Barrister) Act 1876 c 52. Also called the Savings Banks (Barrister) Act 1876
 Sea Insurances (Stamping of Policies) Amendment Act 1876 c 6
 Settled Estates Act 1876 c 30
 Sheriff Courts (Scotland) Act 1876 c 70
 Slave Trade Act 1876 c 46
 Small Testate Estates (Scotland) Act 1876 c 24
 Statute Law Revision (Substituted Enactments) Act 1876 c 20
 Suez Canal (Shares) Act 1876 c 67
 Superannuation Act 1876 c 53
 Superannuation Post Office and War Office Act 1876 c 68
 Supply Act 1876 c 2
 Telegraph (Money) Act 1876 c 5
 Trade Marks Registration Amendment Act 1876 c 33
 Trade Union Act Amendment Act 1876 c 22
 Tramways (Ireland) Amendment (Dublin) Act 1876 c 65. Sometimes called the Dublin Tramways Act 1876.
 Treasury Solicitor Act 1876 c 18
 United Parishes (Scotland) Act 1876 c 11
 Winter Assizes Act 1876 c 57

Local Acts
 An Act to alter the Justiciary District of the County of Peebles [1876] c. clii
 Western Bank of Scotland (Liquidation) Act 1876 c. lxxv

1877 (40 & 41 Vict.)

Public General Acts
 Annual Turnpike Acts Continuance Act 1877 c 64
 Appropriation Act 1877 c 61
 Beer Licences Regulation (Ireland) Act 1877 c 4
 Board of Education (Scotland) Act 1877 c 38
 Borough Quarter Sessions Act 1877 c 17
 Building Societies Act 1877 c 63
 Canal Boats Act 1877 c 60
 Colonial Fortifications Act 1877 c 23
 Colonial Stock Act 1877 c 59
 Companies Act 1877 c 26
 Consolidated Fund (20,000,000l.) Act  c 24
 Constabulary (Ireland) Amendment Act 1877 c 20. Sometimes called the Constabulary (Ireland) Act 1877.
 Contingent Remainders Act 1877 c 33
 County Officers and Courts (Ireland) Act 1877 c 56
 Crown Office Act 1877 c 41
 Customs and Inland Revenue Amendment Act 1877 c 10
 Customs, Inland Revenue, and Savings Banks Act 1877 c 13
 Destructive Insects Act 1877 c 68
 East India Loan Act 1877 c 51
 Evidence Act 1877 c 14
 Exchequer Bills and Bonds Act 1877 c 5
 Expiring Laws Continuance Act 1877 c 67
 Factors Acts Amendment Act 1877 c 39
 Fisheries (Dynamite) Act 1877 c 65
 Fisheries (Oyster, Crab, and Lobster) Act 1877 c 42
 Game Laws Amendment (Scotland) Act 1877 c 28
 General Police and Improvement (Scotland) Act 1862 Amendment Act 1877 c 22
 General Prisons (Ireland) Act 1877 c 49
 Jurisdiction in Rating Act 1877 c 11
 Justices Clerks Act 1877 c 43
 Legal Practitioners Act 1877 c 62
 Limited Owners Reservoirs and Water Supply Further Facilities Act 1877 c 31
 Local Taxation Returns Act 1877 c 66
 Marine Mutiny Act 1877 c 8
 Married Women's Property (Scotland) Act 1877 c 29
 Metropolitan Board of Works (Money) Act 1877 c 52
 Metropolitan Open Spaces Act 1877 c 35
 Municipal Corporations (New Charters) Act 1877 c 69
 Mutiny Act 1877 c 7
 Police (Expenses) Continuance Act 1877 c 58
 Prison Act 1877 c 21
 Prisons (Scotland) Act 1877 c 53
 Public Libraries (Ireland) Amendment Act 1877 c 15
 Public Libraries Amendment Act 1877 c 54
 Public Loans Remission Act 1877 c 32
 Public Record Office Act 1877 c 55. Also called the Public Records Office Act 1877.
 Public Works Loans Act 1877 c 19
 Public Works Loans (Ireland) Act 1877 c 27
 Publicans' Certificates (Scotland) Act (1876) Amendment Act 1877 c 3
 Real Estate Charges Act 1877 c 34
 Registration of Leases (Scotland) Amendment Act 1877 c 36
 Removal of Wrecks Act 1877 c 16
 Settled Estates Act 1877 c 18
 Sheriff Courts (Scotland) Act 1877 c 50
 Solicitors Act 1877 c 25
 South Africa Act 1877 c 47
 Superannuation (Mercantile Marine Fund Officers) Act 1877 c 44
 Supply Act 1877 c 1
 Supply Act 1877 c 6
 Supply Act 1877 c 12
 Supreme Court of Judicature Act 1877 c 9
 Supreme Court of Judicature Act (Ireland) 1877 c 57, commonly cited as the Supreme Court of Judicature (Ireland) Act 1877
 Telegraphs (Money) Act 1877 c 30
 Trade Marks Registration Extension Act 1877 c 37. Sometimes called the Trade Marks, Registration etc. Act 1877.
 Treasury Bills Act 1877 c 2
 Treasury Chest Fund Act 1877 c 45
 Universities of Oxford and Cambridge Act 1877 c 48
 Winter Assizes Act 1877 c 46
 Writs Execution (Scotland) Act 1877 c 40

Local Acts
 Shotts Iron Company's Act 1877 c. xviii

1878 (41 & 42 Vict.)

 Acknowledgement of Deeds by Married Women (Ireland) Act 1878 c 23
 Admiralty and War Office Regulation Act 1878 c 53
 Adulteration of Seeds Act 1878 c 17
 Annual Turnpike Acts Continuance Act 1878 c 62
 Appropriation Act 1878 c 65
 Arranmore Polling District Act 1878 c 75
 Baths and Washhouses Act 1878 c 14
 Bills of Exchange Act 1878 c 13
 Bills of Sale Act 1878 c 31
 Bishoprics Act 1878 c 68
 British Museum Act 1878 c 55
 Commons (Expenses) Act 1878 c 56
 Consolidated Fund Act (6,000,000l.) c 1
 Consolidated Fund (No. 2) Act 1878 c 9
 Consolidated Fund (No. 3) Act 1878 c 21
 Consolidated Fund (No. 4) Act 1878 c 45
 Contagious Diseases (Animals) Act 1878 c 74
 County of Hertford Act 1878 c 50
 Customs and Inland Revenue Act 1878 c 15
 Debtors Act 1878 c 54
 Dentists Act 1878 c 33
 Drainage and Improvement of Lands (Ireland) Act 1878 c 59
 Duke of Connaught and of Strathearn (Establishment) Act 1878 c 46. Sometimes called the Duke of Connaught, Annuity Act 1878.
 Education (Scotland) Act 1878 c 78
 Elders Widows' Fund (India) Act 1878 c 47
 Endowed Institutions (Scotland) Act 1878 c 48
 Entail Amendment (Scotland) Act 1878 c 28
 Exchequer Bills and Bonds Act 1878 c 2
 Exchequer Bonds Act 1878 c 7
 Exchequer Bonds (No. 2) Act 1878 c 22
 Exchequer Bonds and Bills (No. 2) Act 1878 c 64
 Expiring Laws Continuance Act 1878 c 70
 Factory and Workshop Act 1878 c 16
 Fiji Marriage Act 1878 c 61
 Foreign Jurisdiction Act 1878 c 67
 Freshwater Fisheries Act 1878 c 39
 General Police and Improvement (Scotland) Amendment Act 1878 c 30
 Glebe Loan (Ireland) Amendment Act 1878 c 6
 Highways and Locomotives (Amendment) Act 1878 c 77
 House Occupiers Disqualification Removal Act 1878 c 3
 House Occupiers Disqualification Removal (Scotland) Act 1878 c 5
 Innkeepers Act 1878 c 38
 Intermediate Education (Ireland) Act 1878 c 66
 Locomotives Amendment (Scotland) Act 1878 c 58
 Lunatic Asylums Loans (Ireland) Act 1878 c 24
 Marine Mutiny Act 1878 c 11
 Marriage Notice (Scotland) Act 1878 c 43
 Matrimonial Causes Act 1878 c 19
 Metropolis Management and Building Acts Amendment Act 1878 c 32
 Metropolitan Board of Works (Money) Act 1878 c 37
 Metropolitan Commons Act 1878 c 71
 Monuments (Metropolis) Act 1878 c 29
 Mutiny Act 1878 c 10
 Parliamentary Elections (Metropolis) Act 1878 c 4
 Parliamentary Elections Returning Officers Expenses (Scotland) Act 1878 c 41
 Parliamentary and Municipal Registration Act 1878 c 26
 Petty Sessions Clerks and Fines (Ireland) Act 1878 c 69
 Police (Expenses) Continuance Act 1878 c 36
 Poor Afflicted Persons Relief (Ireland) Act 1878 c 60
 Prison (Officers Superannuation) Act 1878 c 63
 Prisons Authorities Act 1874 Amendment Act 1878 c 40
 Public Health (Ireland) Act 1878 c 52
 Public Health (Water) Act 1878 c 25
 Public Parks (Scotland) Act 1878 c 8
 Public Works Loans Act 1878 c 18
 Railway Returns (Continuous Brakes) Act 1878 c 20
 Roads and Bridges (Scotland) Act 1878 c 51
 Sale of Liquors on Sunday (Ireland) Act 1878 c 72
 South Wales Highway Act Amendment Act 1878 c 34
 Statute Law Revision Act 1878 c 79
 Statute Law Revision (Ireland) Act 1878 c 57
 Supreme Court of Judicature (Officers) Act 1878 c 35
 Supreme Court of Judicature Act (Ireland) 1877 Amendment Act 1878 c 27
 Telegraph Act 1878 c 76
 Territorial Waters Jurisdiction Act 1878 c 73
 Threshing Machines Act 1878 c 12
 Tithe Act 1878 c 42
 Truro Chapter Act 1878 c 44
 Weights and Measures Act 1878 c 49

1879 (42 & 43 Vict.)

Public General Acts
 Annual Turnpike Acts Continuance Act 1879 c 46
 Appropriation Act 1879 c 51
 Army Discipline and Regulation Act 1879 c 33
 Artizans and Labourers Dwellings Act (1868) Amendment Act 1879 c 64
 Artizans and Labourers Dwellings Improvement Act 1879 c 63
 Assessed Rates Act 1879 c 10
 Bankers' Books Evidence Act 1879 c 11
 Bills of Sale (Ireland) Act 1879 c 50
 Children's Dangerous Performances Act 1879 c 34
 Civil Procedure Acts Repeal Act 1879 c 59
 Commissioners of Woods (Thames Piers) Act 1879 c 73
 Commons Act 1879 c 37
 Companies Act 1879 c 76
 Confirmation of Marriages on Her Majesty's Ships Act 1879 c 29
 Consolidated Fund (No. 1) Act 1879 c 2
 Consolidated Fund (No. 2) Act 1879 c 7
 Consolidated Fund (No. 3) Act 1879 c 14
 Consolidated Fund (No. 4) Act 1879 c 20
 Convention (Ireland) Act Repeal Act 1879 c 28
 Convention of Royal Burghs (Scotland) Act 1879 c 27
 Conveyancing (Scotland) Act 1874 Amendment Act 1879 c 40
 Customs Buildings Act 1879 c 36
 Customs and Inland Revenue Act 1879 c 21
 Dispensary Houses (Ireland) Act 1879 c 25
 District Auditors Act 1879 c 6
 East India Loan Act 1879 c 60
 East Indian Loan (Annuities) Act 1879 c 61
 East Indian Railway (Redemption of Annuities) Act 1879 c 43
 Elementary Education (Industrial Schools) Act 1879 c 48
 Endowed School Acts Continuance Act 1879 c 66
 Exchequer Bills and Bonds Act 1879 c 62
 Exchequer Bonds (No. 1) Act 1879 c 3
 Expiring Laws Continuance Act 1879 c 67
 Friendly Societies Amendment Act 1879 c 9. Also called the Friendly Societies Act 1879, and the Friendly Societies Act (1875) Amendment Act.
 Habitual Drunkards Act 1879 c 19
 Hares Preservation (Ireland) Act 1879 c 23
 Highway Accounts Returns Act 1879 c 39
 House of Commons Costs Taxation Act 1879 c 17
 Indian Advance Act 1879 c 45
 Indian Guaranteed Railways Act 1879 c 41
 Land Tax Commissioners (Names) Act 1879 c 52
 Lord Clerk Register (Scotland) Act 1879 c 44
 Marine Mutiny Act (Temporary) Continuance Act 1879 c 5
 Metropolitan Board of Works (Money) Act 1879 c 69
 Metropolitan Board of Works Indemnity Act 1879 c 68
 Military Prisons Act 1879 or the Army Discipline and Regulation (Commencement) Act 1879 c 32
 Municipal Elections (Ireland) Act 1879 c 53
 Mutiny Act (Temporary) Continuance Act 1879 c 4
 National School Teachers (Ireland) Act 1879 c 74
 Parliamentary Elections and Corrupt Practices Act 1879 c 75
 Petroleum Act 1879 c 47
 Petty Customs (Scotland) Abolition Act Amendment Act c 13. Sometimes called the Burgh, Scotland (Petty Customs), Act 1879.
 Poor Law Act 1879 c 54
 Poor Law Amendment Act 1879 c 12
 Prevention of Crime Act 1879 c 55
 Prosecution of Offences Act 1879 c 22
 Public Health (Interments) Act 1879 c 31
 Public Health (Ireland) Amendment Act 1879 c 57
 Public Health (Scotland) Act 1867 Amendment Act 1879 c 15. Sometimes called the Public Health (Scotland) Amendment Act 1879.
 Public Loans Remission Act 1879 c 35
 Public Offices Fees Act 1879 c 58
 Public Works Loans Act 1879 c 77
 Racecourses Licensing Act 1879 c 18. Sometimes called the Racecourse Licensing Act 1879.
 Registration of Births, Deaths, and Marriages (Army) Act 1879 c 8
 Registry Courts (Ireland) Amendment Act 1879 c 71
 Regulation of Railways Acts 1873 and 1874 Continuance Act 1879 c 56
 Sale of Food and Drugs Act Amendment Act 1879 c 30
 Salmon Fishery Law Amendment Act 1879 c 26
 Shipping Casualties Investigations Act 1879 c 72
 Slave Trade (East African Courts) Act 1879 c 38
 Spring Assizes Act 1879 c 1
 Statute Law Revision (Ireland) Act 1879 c 24
 Summary Jurisdiction Act 1879 c 49
 Supreme Court of Judicature (Officers) Act 1879 c 78
 University Education (Ireland) Act 1879 c 65
 Vaccination Amendment (Ireland) Act 1879 c 70
 Valuation of Lands (Scotland) Amendment Act 1879 c 42
 West India Loan Act 1879 c 16

Local and Personal Acts
 Wormwood Scrubs Act 1879 c. cix

See also
 List of Acts of the Parliament of the United Kingdom

External links
- 23 & 24 Victoria - 1860
- 24 & 25 Victoria - 1861 - different edition
- 25 & 26 Victoria - 1862
- 26 & 27 Victoria - 1863
- 27 & 28 Victoria - 1864
- 28 & 29 Victoria - 1865 - different edition
- 29 & 30 Victoria - 1866 - different edition
- 30 & 31 Victoria - 1867
- 31 & 32 Victoria - 1867-8 - different edition
- Volume 108 - 32 & 33 Victoria - 1868-9 - also - also
- 33 & 34 Victoria - 1870
- 34 & 35 Victoria - 1871
- 35 & 36 Victoria - 1872
- 36 & 37 Victoria - 1873
- Volume 9 - 37 & 38 Victoria - 1874 
- 38 & 39 Victoria - 1875 - also
- Volume 11 - 39 & 40 Victoria - 1876
- Volume 12 - 40 & 41 Victoria - 1877
- Volume 13 - 41 & 42 Victoria - 1878 #- 41 & 42 Victoria - 1878
- Volume 14 - 42 & 43 Victoria - 1879

References

1860
1860s in the United Kingdom
1870s in the United Kingdom